= Urbanowo =

Urbanowo may refer to the following places:

- Urbanowo, part of the Jeżyce district of Poznań
- Urbanowo, Greater Poland Voivodeship (west-central Poland)
- Urbanowo, Pomeranian Voivodeship (north Poland)
- Urbanowo, Warmian-Masurian Voivodeship (north Poland)
