= Kunik =

Kunik may refer to:

- Kunik (greeting), a form of greeting in Inuit cultures
- Kunik (surname), a Jewish surname
- Kunik, Poland, a village
- Kunik cheese, an American cheese

== See also ==
- Kunić
