= Dobre Miasto =

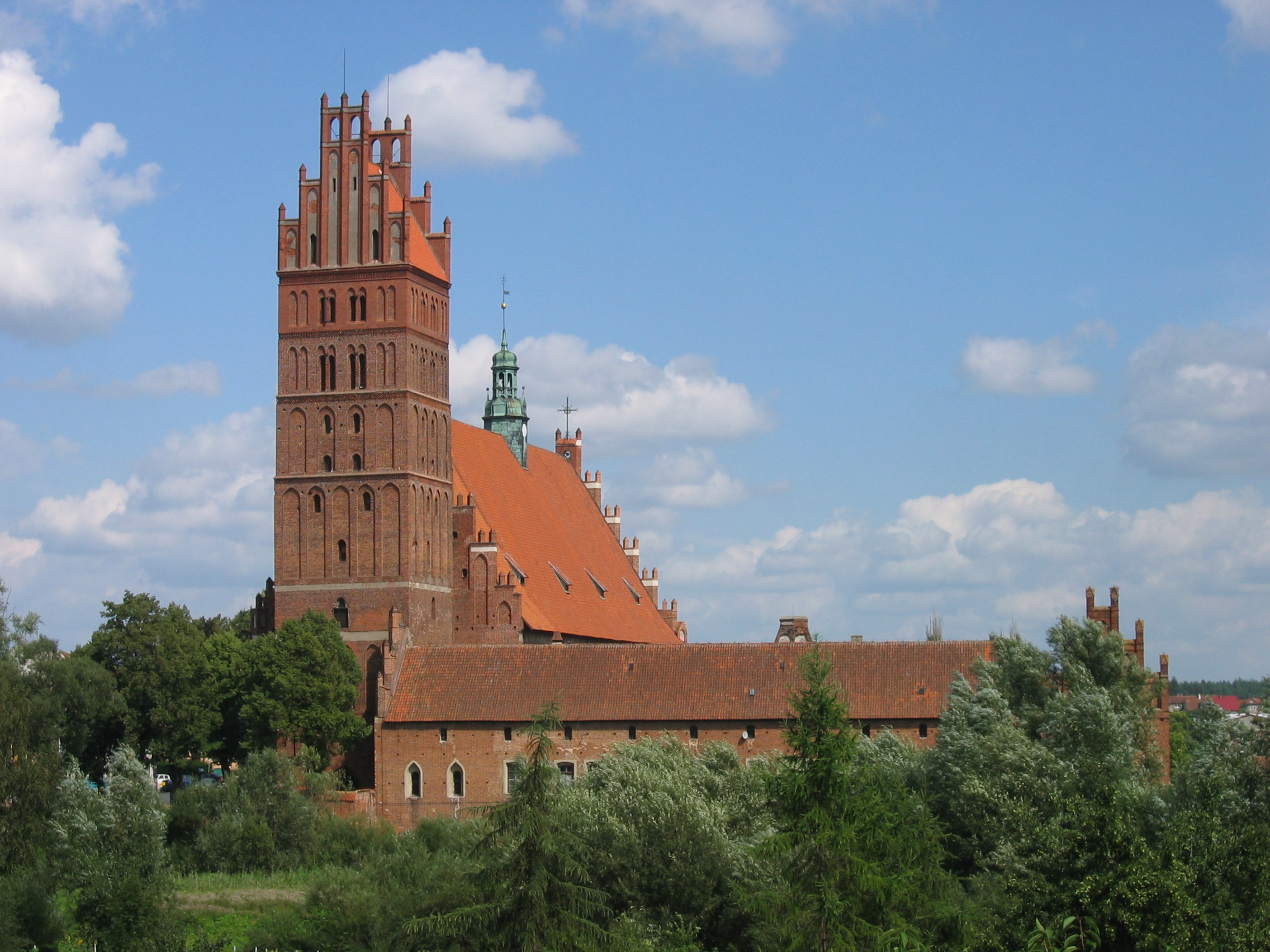
- Collegiate church of the Holy Saviour and All Saints in Dobre Miasto

- Flag Coat of arms

- Location within Poland
- Coordinates: 53°59′15″N 20°23′45″E
- Country: Poland
- Voivodeship: Warmian-Masurian
- County: Olsztyn
- Gmina: Dobre Miasto
- Town rights: 1329

Government
  - Mayor: Beata Harań

Area
  - Total: 4.86 km^{2} (1.88 sq mi)

Population (31 December 2021)
  - Total: 9,857
  - Density: 2,030/km^{2} (5,250/sq mi)
- Time zone: UTC+1 (CET)
  - Summer (DST): UTC+2 (CEST)
- Postal code: 11-040
- Area code: +48 086
- Car plates: NOL
- Website: http://www.dobremiasto.com.pl

Dobre Miasto (Polish: [ˈdɔbrɛ ˈmjastɔ]; German: Guttstadt [ˈɡʊt.ʃtat]; literally Good Town) is a town in northern Poland, in the Warmian-Masurian Voivodeship with 9,857 inhabitants as of December 2021. It is situated in the northwestern part of the Masurian Lake District in the heart of the historical region of Warmia. It is also the seat of Dobre Miasto Commune which consists of the main town and 21 village administrative divisions, with a total population of 16,014.

== History ==
=== Middle Ages ===
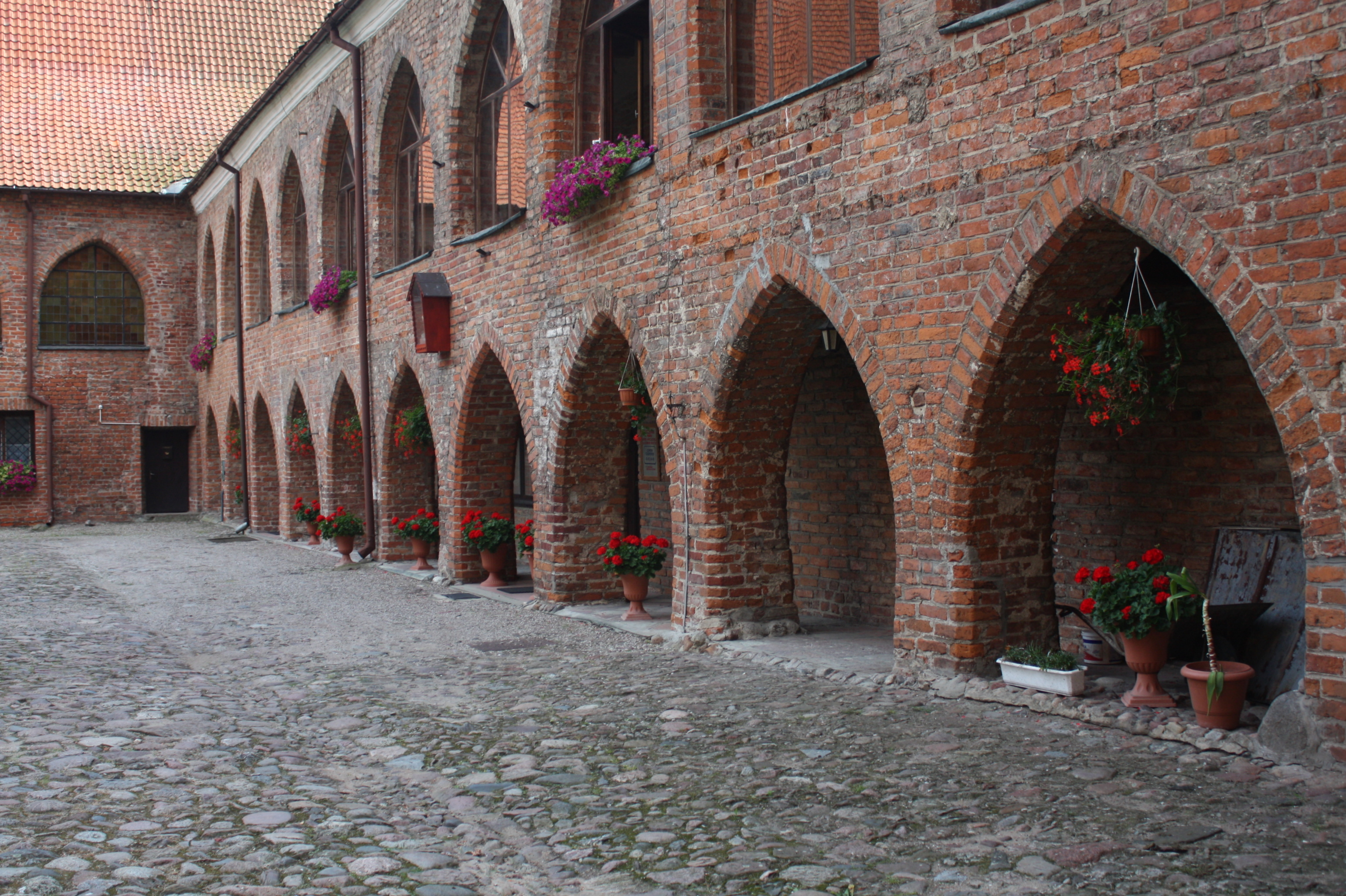
Gothic collegiate buildings

Dobre Miasto was founded on the place of a destroyed Old Prussian settlement. It received German town privileges on 26 December 1329. The name of the town was spelled in different ways: Guddestat, Godenstat, Gudinstat, Gutberg, Gutenstat, Guthenstadt, Guthinstadt. The Latin name of the region (Pogesania) was derived from the Old Prussian word gudde (a bush/thicket). It is possible that the name of the town originated from this word. The Teutonic Order changed the Old Prussian pronunciation of the name into Guttstadt. However, as early as in 1336 the Latin translation of the name appeared - Bona Civitas. The Polish name is a literal translation from the German language, and historically it was spelled both Dobre Miasto and Dobremiasto. In English both Guttstadt and Dobre Miasto mean "good town".

The first burgomaster of the town was Wilhelm von Wormditt. The coat of arms of the town was a deer holding an oak-twig with two acorns. The town tinctures were white (argent) and green (vert). The patron of the town was Saint Catherine of Alexandria.

In 1347 a Collegiate Chapter was transferred here from Głotowo (Glotau), which event was of great importance for further development of Guttstadt. In the course of the following decades, the canons erected a church, a parish school and a hospital. The town, similarly as the whole region of Warmia, was the scene of different war campaigns. In 1440 the town joined the Prussian Confederation, which opposed the Teutonic Order, and at the request of which in 1454 King Casimir IV Jagiellon signed the act of incorporation of the town and region to Poland. The town recognized the Polish King as rightful ruler shortly after and pledged allegiance in Elbląg. In the peace treaty signed in Toruń in 1466, Warmia and Dobre Miasto were finally renounced by the Teutonic Knights and recognized as part of Poland. Administratively it was part of the Prince-Bishopric of Warmia in the province of Royal Prussia in the larger Greater Poland Province.

=== Modern era ===
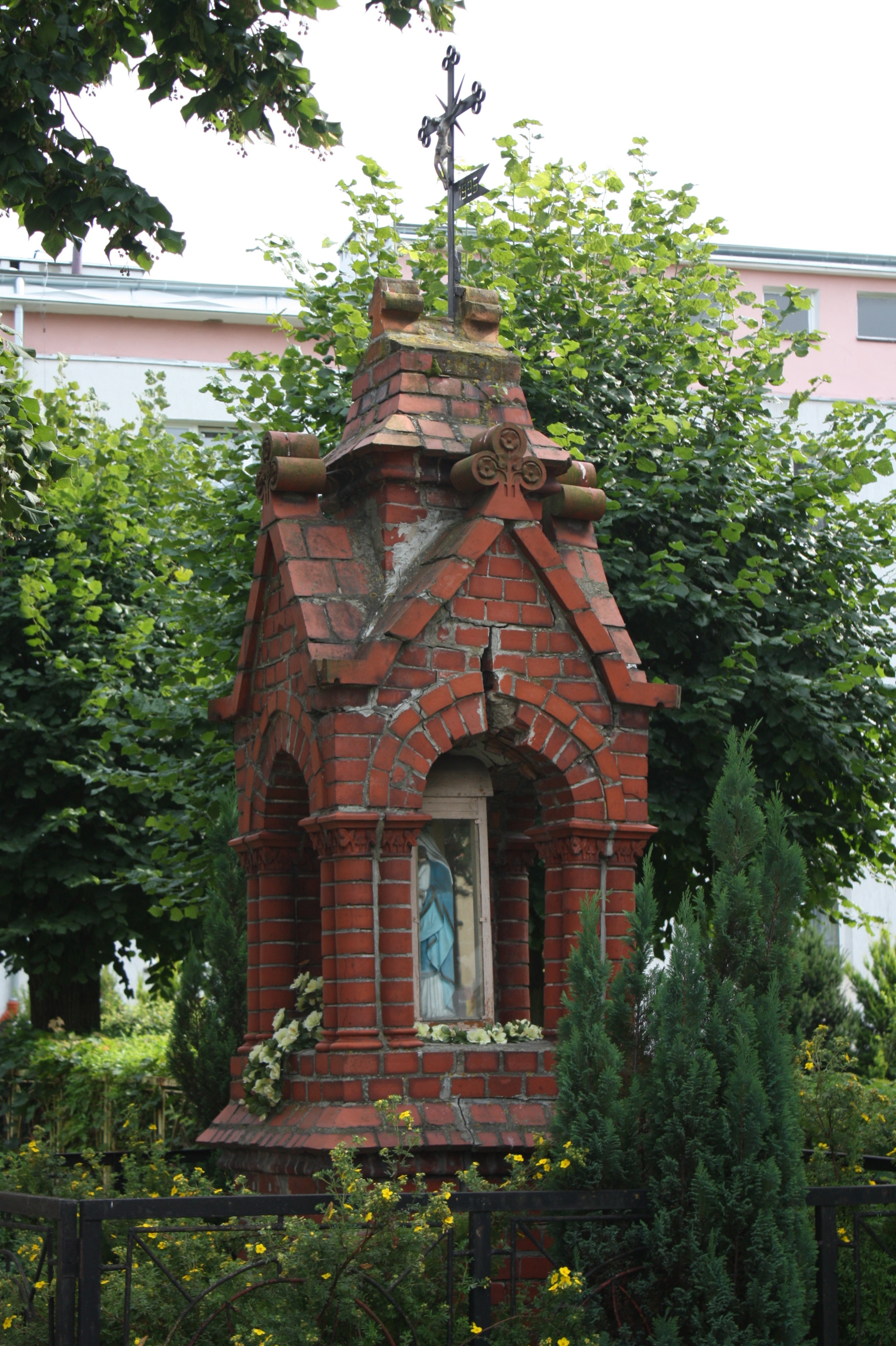
Typical Warmian old wayside shrine

In 1538 Nicolaus Copernicus visited the town when he accompanied Bishop Johannes Dantiscus. The 16th century was a period of peace, which ended abruptly with Swedish invasion in 1626. The Swedes overran the town several times but the inhabitants suffered most severely during the Deluge in the years 1655-1660.

In 1772 the town was annexed by the Kingdom of Prussia in the First Partition of Poland. The population of the town numbered 1831. In 1807 Guttstadt was seized in turn by the French, the Prussians and the Russians. In the Battle of Guttstadt-Deppen on 5 and 6 June 1807, the Russian army under General Levin August, Count von Bennigsen attacked Marshal Michel Ney's French corps. Though badly outnumbered, Ney conducted an effective rear-guard action and escaped to the southwest across the Pasłęka River with most of his troops. Napoleon Bonaparte spent a night in the Collegiate between 8 and 9 June 1807. The Collegiate chapter was dissolved and its properties were parcelled out on the strength of the edict issued by King Frederick William III of Prussia on 5 October 1810. In the years 1830-1834 the evangelical church was erected, mainly thanks to the donations of Frederick William III.

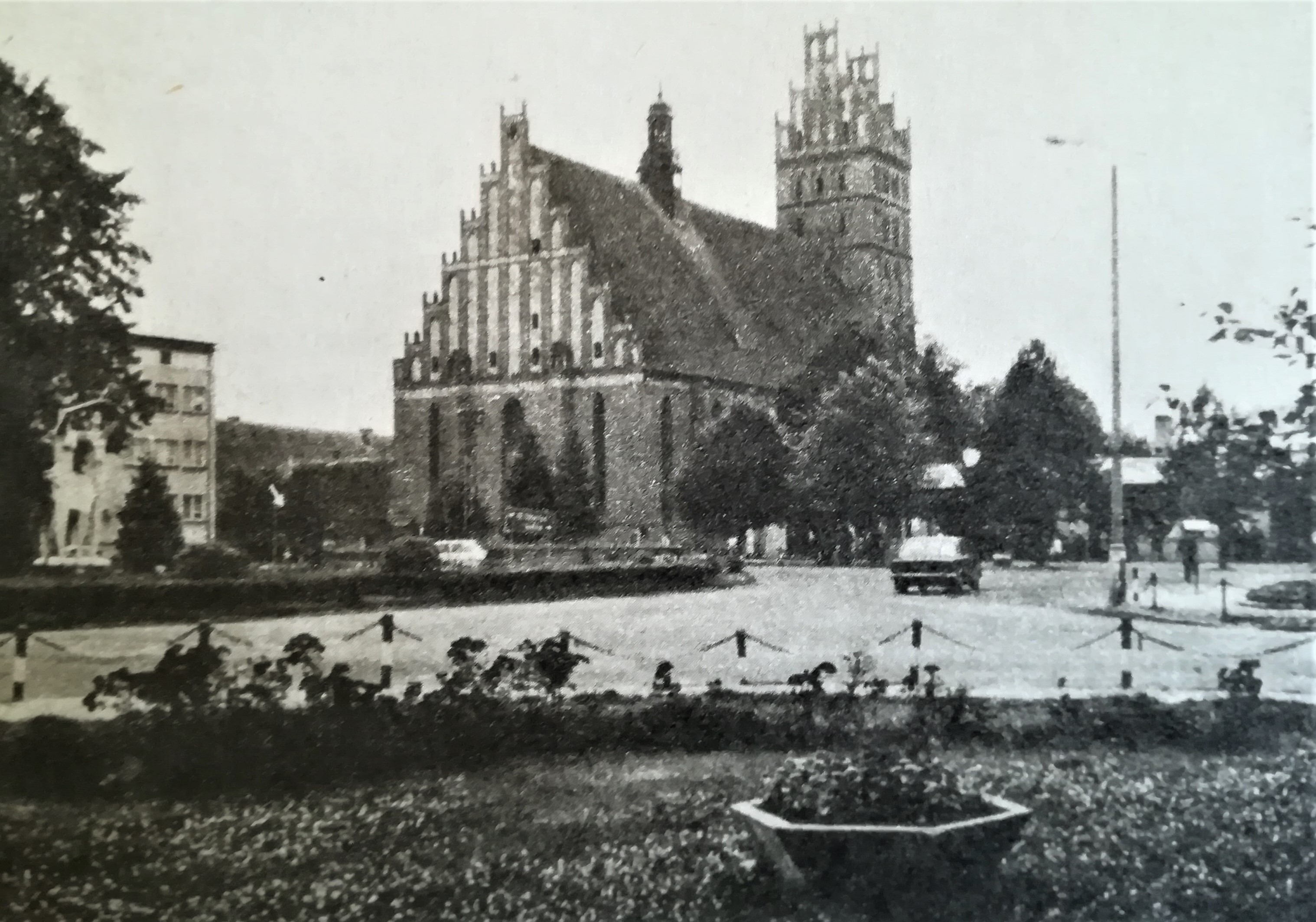
Dobre Miasto in 1986

It was not until 1812 that three Jewish families were allowed to settle in Guttstadt. In 1814 they bought land for a Jewish cemetery. It was devastated during World War II. It covered an area of 0.2 hectares. Today, a residential neighborhood with single-family homes stands on its site. In 1855, the town's synagogue was consecrated - serving the 240 community members.

During World War II, Guttstadt was 65% destroyed during its capture by the Soviet Red Army and the NKVD. After the Potsdam Conference the town was again handed over to Poland and renamed to its historic Polish name Dobre Miasto. The town's German population was expelled towards the remainder of Germany, and many Poles displaced from former eastern Poland annexed by the Soviet Union settled in the town. On 1 August 1945, a Soviet garrison handed over power to Jan Majdecki, the first post-war mayor of the town.

== Main sights ==
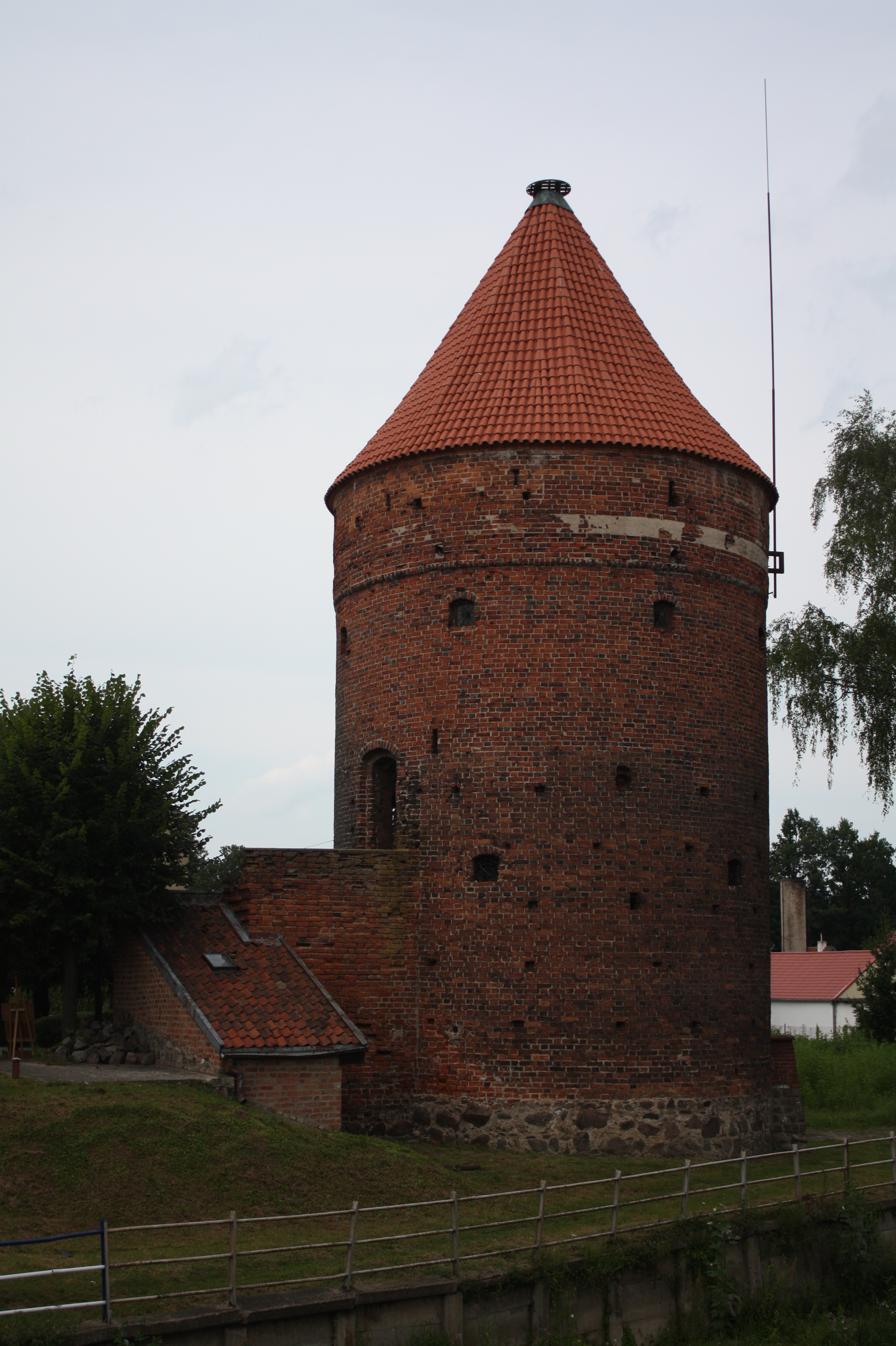
The Stork Tower

- The Gothic collegiate complex built from 1357–1389, with a church on which Pope John Paul II conferred the title of minor basilica (1989). One of the tourist attractions besides the interior and the furnishings of the church is the organ with 49 tones and 3522 pipes. The former capitulary library houses a parish museum, which is open to visitors. It contains the remains of the old outfit of the collegiate. The collection of books and manuscripts largely scattered after World War II.
- The St Nicholas Church, in Baroque style, built from 1736-1741. At present it is a Greek Catholic parish temple.
- The Stork Tower (Baszta Bociania) with fragments of the medieval city walls. The tower owes its name to storks which have nested on its top. At present the tower is the residence of one of the sections of the Cultural Society. In the summer season tourists can visit a miniature museum created by the members of the society.

== Transport ==
Dobre Miasto lies on national road 51 which connects it to Olsztyn and Lidzbark Warmiński.

Dobre Miasto has a station on the Braniewo-Olsztyn railway line.

== Sports ==
The local football team is DKS Dobre Miasto. It competes in the lower leagues.

== Notable residents ==
- Andrzej Chryzostom Załuski (1650–1711), Polish preacher, translator, Chancellor of the Crown and Catholic bishop; died in Dobre Miasto
- Augustinus Bludau (1863–1930), Catholic bishop
- Curt Johannes Braun (1903-1961), German screenwriter
- Friedrich Ernst Dorn, (1848–1916), German physicist
- Waldemar Milewicz, (1956–2004), Polish journalist
- Łukasz Kadziewicz, (born 1980), Polish volleyball player
- Norbert Wojnarowski, (born 1976), Polish politician,
- Piotr Nowak, (born 1980) Polish politician,

== International relations ==
Dobre Miasto is a member of Cittaslow.

Dobre Miasto is twinned with:

- Quakenbrück, Germany (2000)
- Montierchaume, France (2002)
- Kostopil, Ukraine (2007)

== Gallery ==
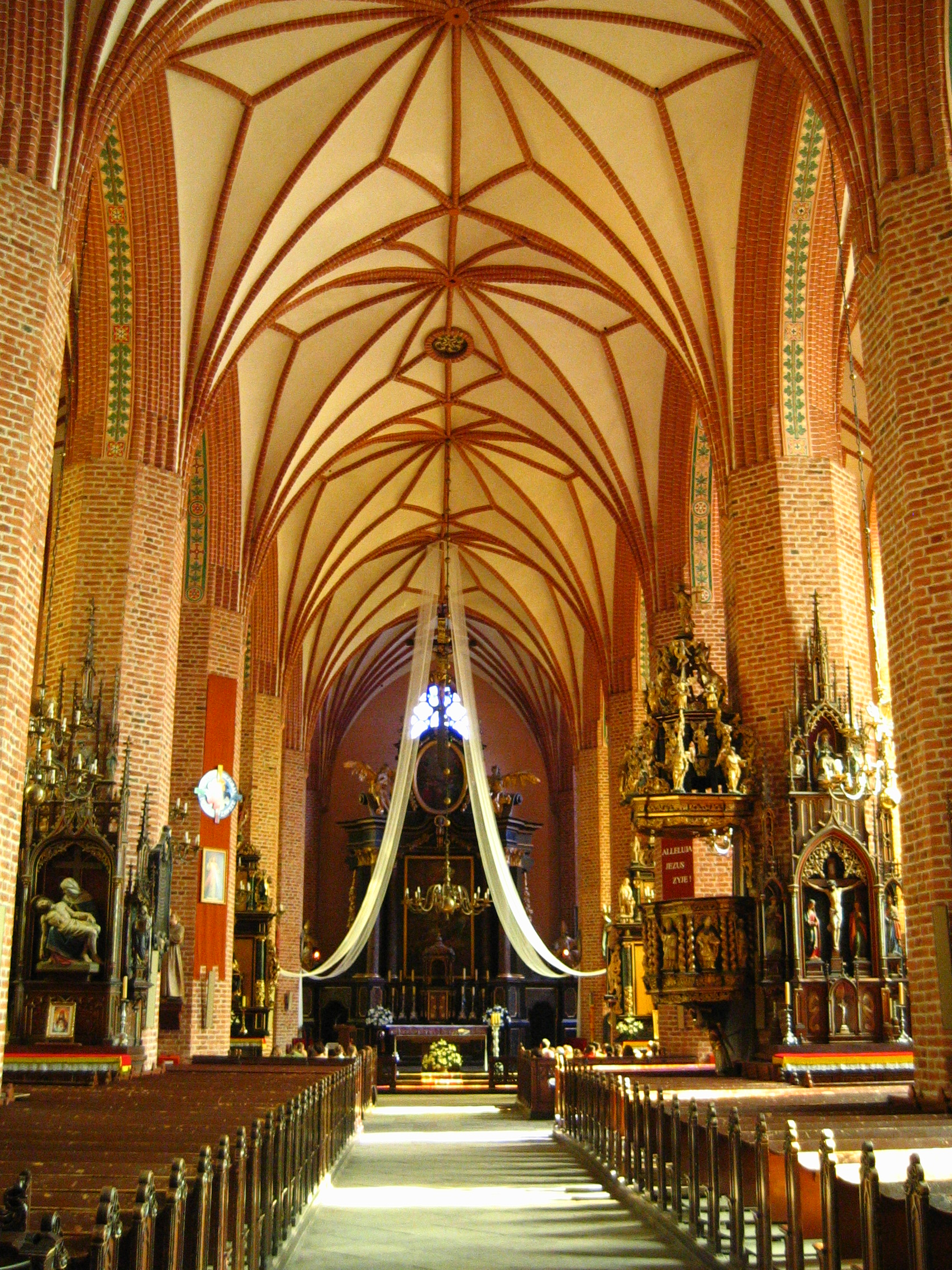
Interior of the collegiate church

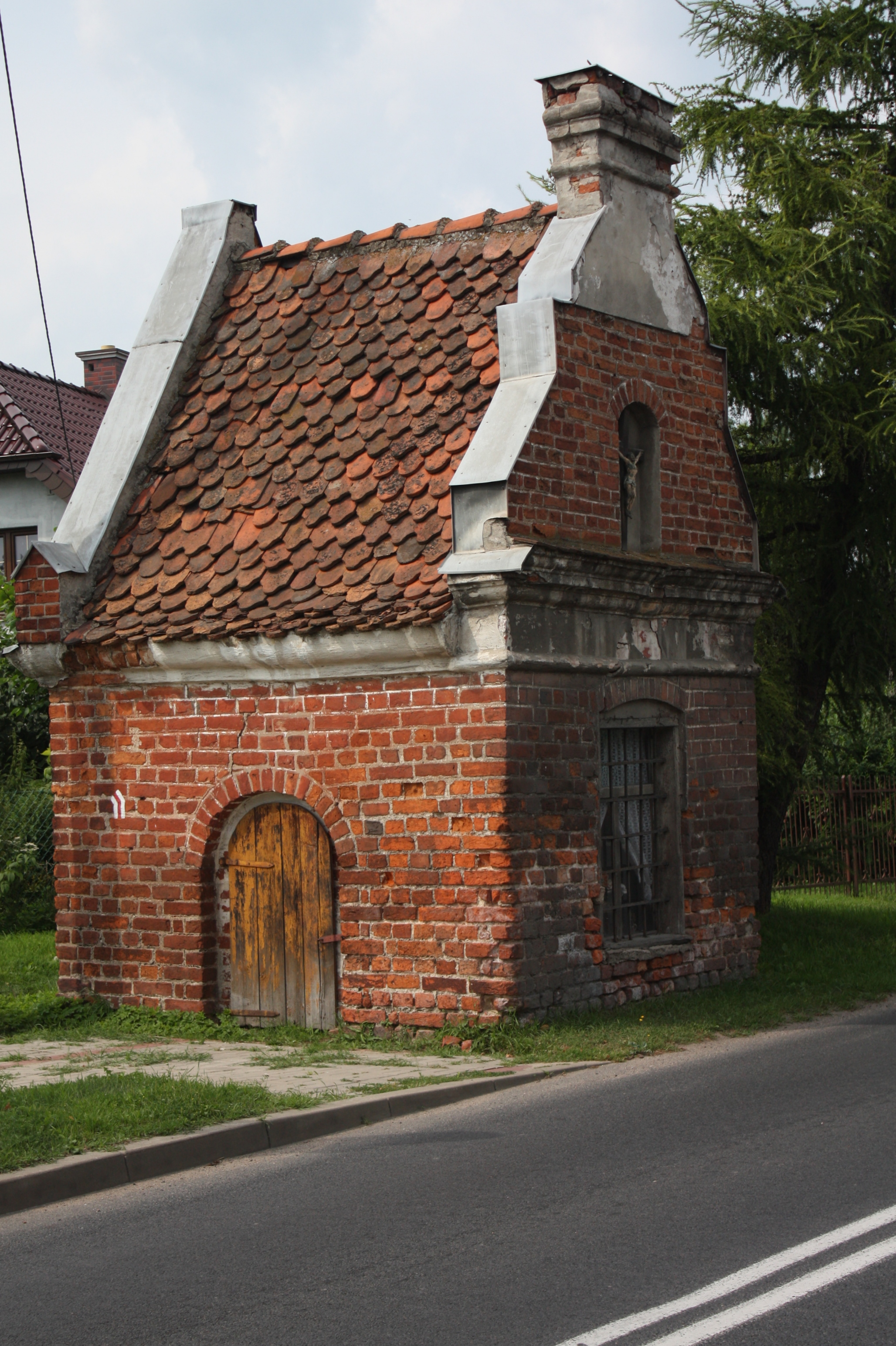
Saint George Chapel

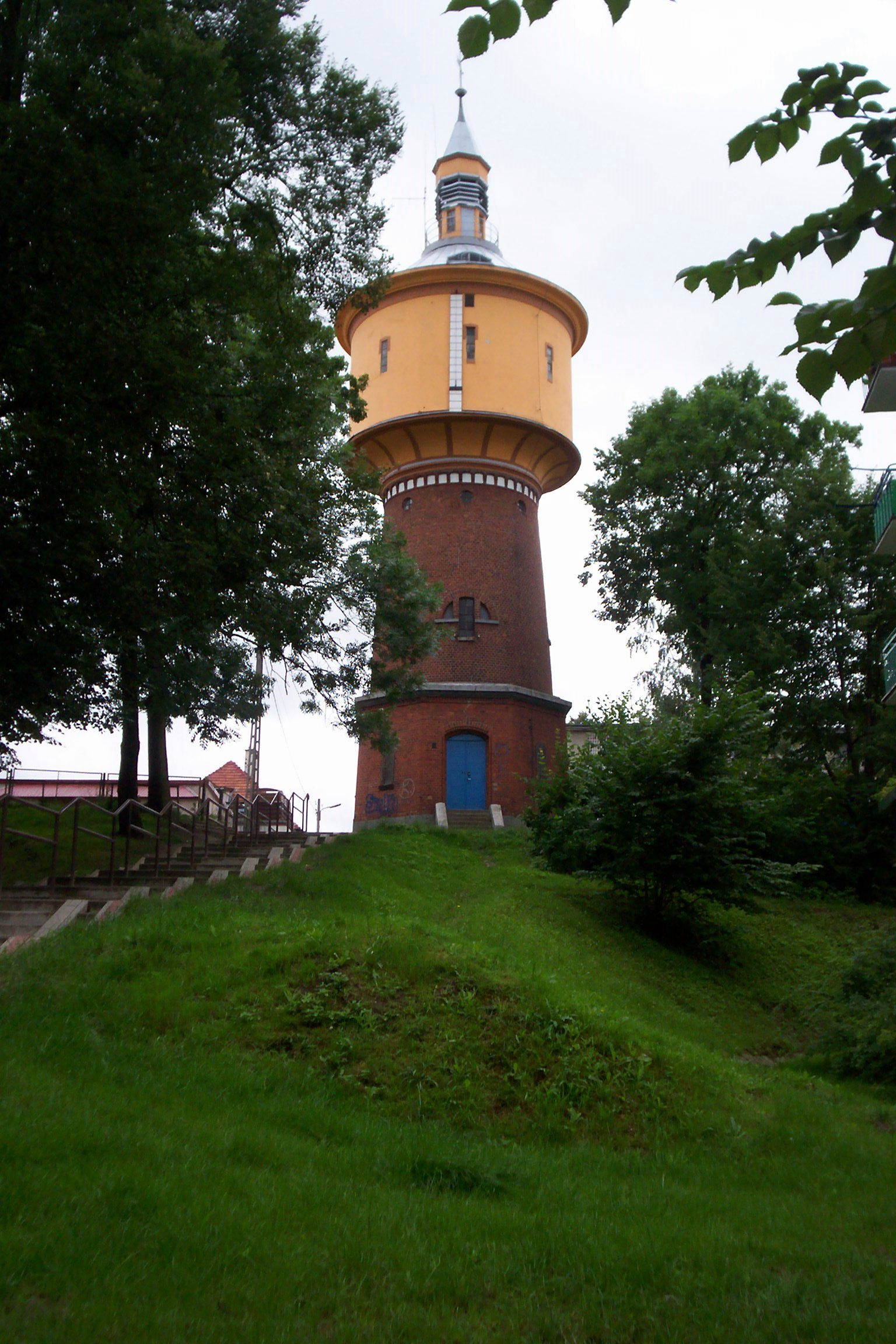
Water tower

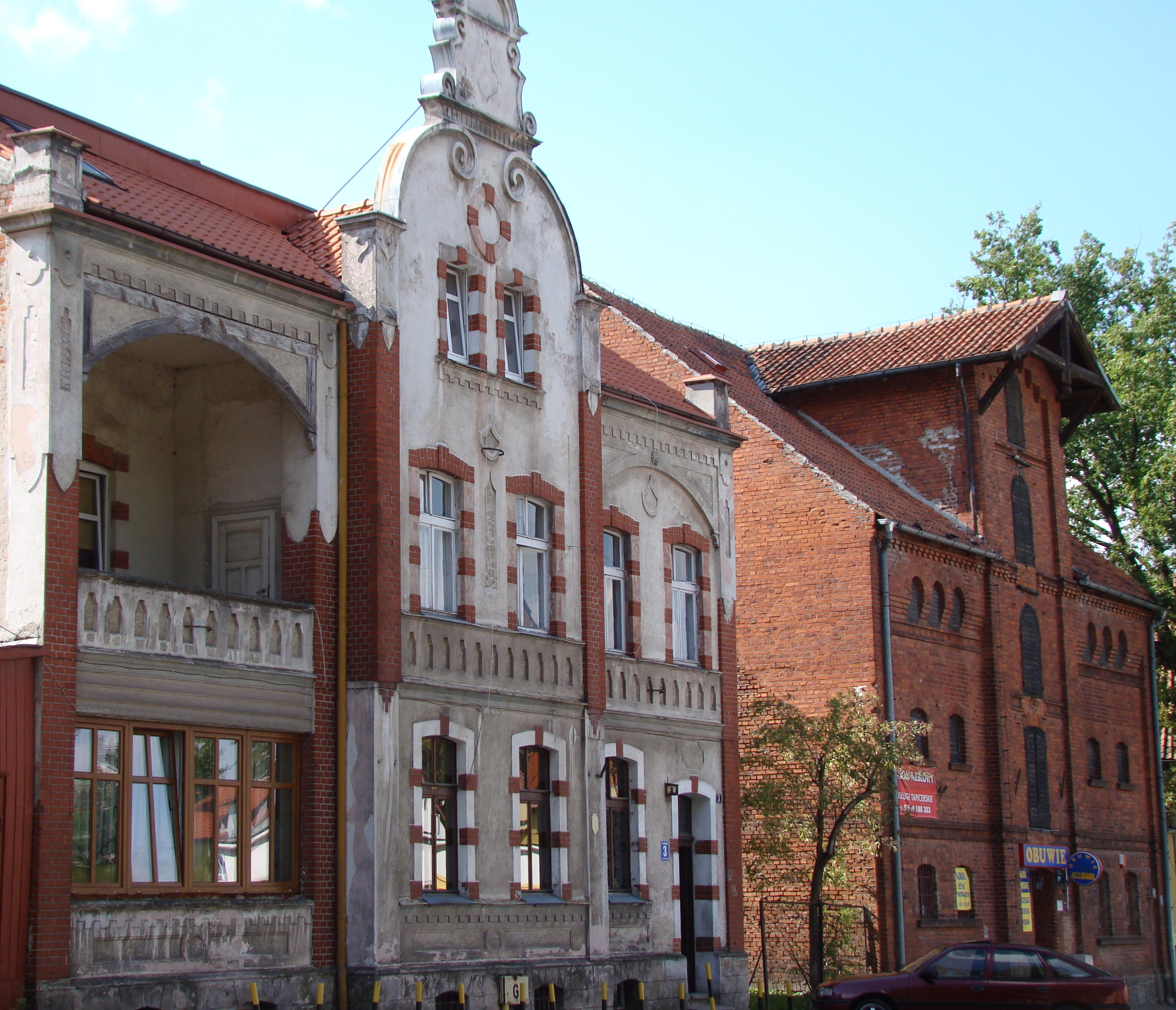
Historic architecture: a townhouse and a former granary
