= Piotraszewo =

- Village
- Location within Poland
- Coordinates: 54°3′59″N 20°23′16″E
- Country: Poland
- Voivodeship: Warmian-Masurian
- County: Olsztyn
- Gmina: Dobre Miasto

Piotraszewo [pjɔtraˈʂɛvɔ] is a village in the administrative district of Gmina Dobre Miasto, within Olsztyn County, Warmian-Masurian Voivodeship, in northern Poland.
