= Gmina Dobre Miasto =

Gmina Dobre Miasto Dobre Miasto Commune
- Gmina
- Coat of arms
- Interactive map of Gmina Dobre Miasto
- Coordinates (Dobre Miasto): 53°59′15″N 20°23′45″E
- Country: Poland
- Voivodeship: Warmian-Masurian
- County: Olsztyn County
- Seat: Dobre Miasto

Area
  - Total: 258.7 km^{2} (99.9 sq mi)

Population (2006)
  - Total: 15,920
  - Density: 61.54/km^{2} (159.4/sq mi)
  - Urban: 10,489
  - Rural: 5,431

Gmina Dobre Miasto is an urban-rural gmina (administrative district) in Olsztyn County, Warmian-Masurian Voivodeship, in northern Poland. Its seat is the town of Dobre Miasto, which lies approximately 24 kilometres (15 mi) north of the regional capital Olsztyn.

The gmina covers an area of 258.7 square kilometres (99.9 sq mi), and as of 2006 its total population is 15,920 (out of which the population of Dobre Miasto amounts to 10,489, and the population of the rural part of the gmina is 5,431).

== Villages ==
Apart from the town of Dobre Miasto, Gmina Dobre Miasto contains the villages and settlements of Barcikowo, Bzowiec, Cerkiewnik, Głotowo, Jesionowo, Kabikiejmy, Kabikiejmy Dolne, Kłódka, Knopin, Kosyń, Kunik, Łęgno, Mawry, Międzylesie, Nowa Wieś Mała, Orzechowo, Piotraszewo, Podleśna, Praslity, Smolajny, Stary Dwór, Swobodna, Urbanowo and Wichrowo.

== Neighbouring gminas ==
Gmina Dobre Miasto is bordered by the gminas of Dywity, Jeziorany, Lidzbark Warmiński, Lubomino and Świątki.
