= Kabikiejmy =

- Village
- Location within Poland
- Coordinates: 53°55′06″N 20°27′55″E
- Country: Poland
- Voivodeship: Warmian-Masurian
- County: Olsztyn
- Gmina: Dobre Miasto
- Population: 400

Kabikiejmy [kabiˈkʲɛi̯mɨ] is a village in the administrative district of Gmina Dobre Miasto, within Olsztyn County, Warmian-Masurian Voivodeship, in northern Poland.

Before 1772 the area was part of Kingdom of Poland, and in 1772–1945 it belonged to Prussia and Germany (East Prussia), called Ober Kapkeim.

== Notable residents ==
- Oskar Negt (1934–2024), philosopher and social theorist
