= August Grunau =

German politician

Member of the National Assembly
- In office 1919–1920
- Constituency: Breslau

Personal details
- Born: 12 September 1881 Klingerswalde, East Prussia, German Empire (Podleśna, Poland)
- Died: 21 June 1931 (aged 49) Oppeln, Weimar Germany (Opole, Poland)
- Party: Centre Party (Germany) (Zentrum)

August Grunau (12 July 1881 – 21 June 1931) was a German politician and Unionist, he was a member of the Weimar National Assembly representing the Catholic Centre Party.

Grunau was born in Klingerswalde, East Prussia (Podleśna, Poland), he started to work on farms and left East Prussia at the age of 15 to work in different factories in Westphalia and Hanover. In 1906 he joined the Christian Association of factory and transport laborers and became its chairman in Hanover from 1907 to 1913. On 1 August 1913 he became the district chairman of this Association for the Provinces of Silesia and Posen.

He was elected a member of the Weimar National Assembly in 1919 representing the constituency of Breslau (Wroclaw). Grunau died in 1931 in Oppeln, Silesia (Opole).
