= Cerkiewnik =

- Village
- Location within Poland
- Coordinates: 53°55′N 20°24′E
- Country: Poland
- Voivodeship: Warmian-Masurian
- County: Olsztyn
- Gmina: Dobre Miasto
- Population: 429 (2,011)

Cerkiewnik [t͡sɛrˈkʲɛvnik] is a village in the administrative district of Gmina Dobre Miasto, within Olsztyn County, Warmian-Masurian Voivodeship, in northern Poland.
