= Baptiste Pierre Bisson =

French soldier

Baptiste Pierre Francois Bisson
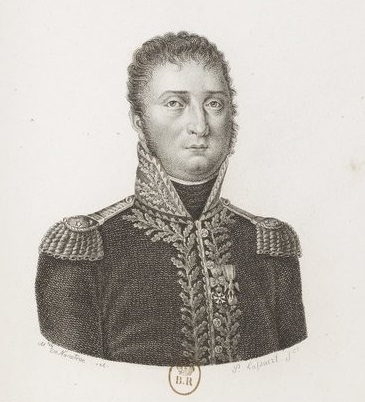
- General of Division Baptiste Pierre Bisson
- Born: 16 February 1767; Montpellier, Hérault, France
- Died: 26 July 1811 (aged 44) Mantua, Italy
- Allegiance: France
- Rank: General of Division
- Conflicts: French Revolutionary Wars; Napoleonic Wars
- Awards: Légion d'honneur, GO 1805
- Other work: Count of the Empire, 1808

Baptiste-Pierre-François, Count Bisson (French pronunciation: [batist pjɛʁ fʁɑ̃swa bisɔ̃]; 16 February 1767 at Montpellier, France – 26 July 1811, at Mantua in the Kingdom of Italy) joined the French army and rose rapidly in rank during the French Revolutionary Wars. He served as a division commander in the Grande Armée of Emperor Napoleon in 1805 and 1807, playing a leading role at the Battle of Friedland. He was captured by Tyrolean rebels in 1809. Known as a gourmand, he became very fat before dying prematurely. His surname is one of the Names inscribed under the Arc de Triomphe.

== Revolution ==
Bisson was born on 16 February 1767 at Montpellier in the south of France in what later became the department of Hérault. On 23 May 1793, while a chef de bataillon (major), he led 60 grenadiers and 50 dragoons in the heroic defense of a village. On 19 September 1794, he was elevated in rank to chef de brigade (colonel) of the 26th Demi-Brigade. On 23 May 1796, he transferred to command the 43rd Line Infantry Demi-Brigade. He led the 43rd at the Battle of Marengo on 14 June 1800. During the engagement his demi-brigade fought as part of Jacques-Antoine de Chambarlhac de Laubespin's division. Recognizing his intelligence and courage, Napoleon promoted Bisson to general of brigade on 5 July 1800.

== Empire ==
On 1 February 1805, Bisson was named general of division. At the beginning of the War of the Third Coalition, he led an infantry division in Marshal Louis-Nicolas Davout's III Corps. Command of the division passed to Marie-François Auguste de Caffarelli du Falga, who led it at the Battle of Austerlitz after Bisson was badly wounded during the pursuit at the passage of the Traun River. He became a Grand Officer of the Légion d'honneur on 25 December 1805.

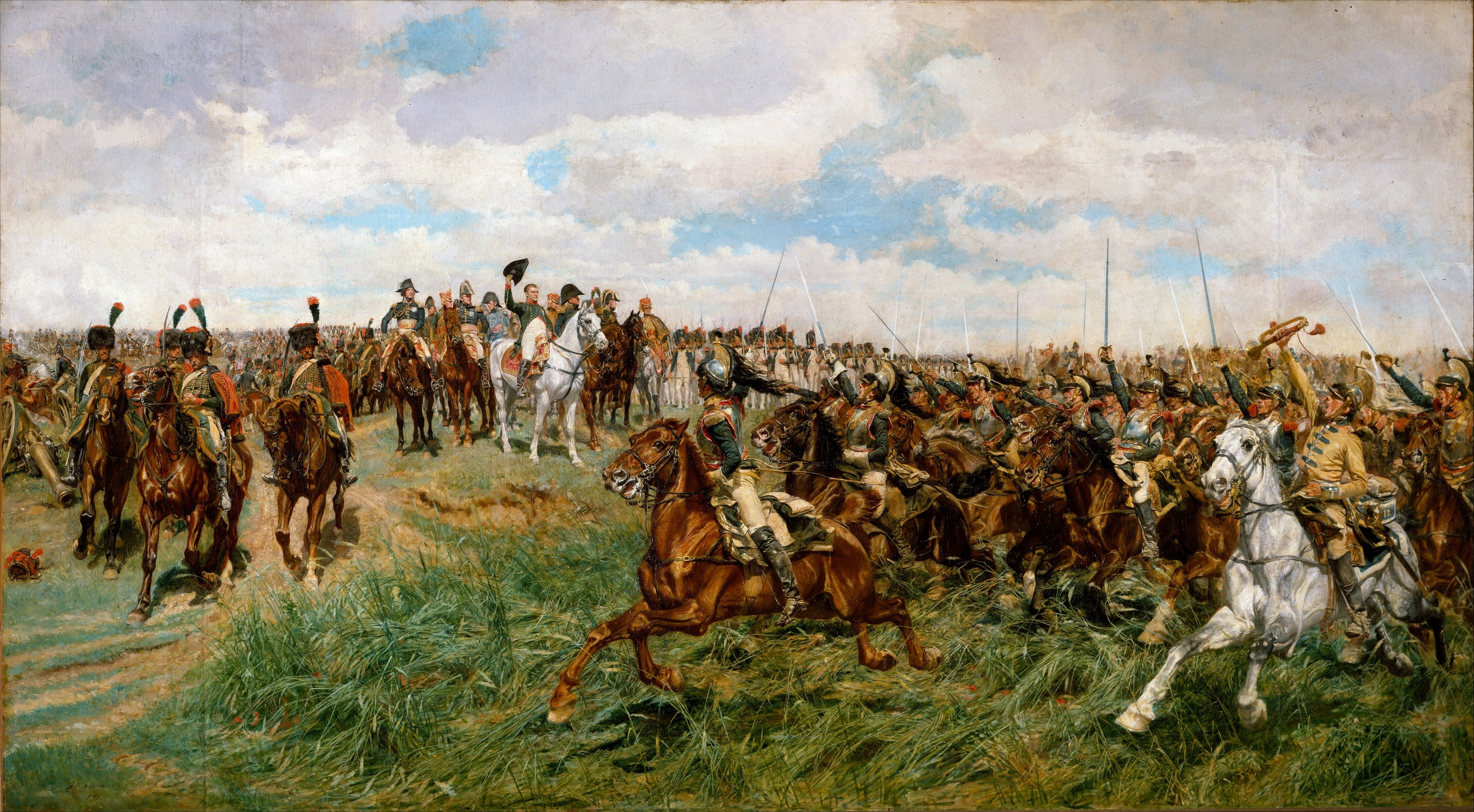
Charge of the French Cuirassiers at Friedland by Meissonier

At the end of the War of the Fourth Coalition, Napoleon recalled Bisson to command one of Marshal Michel Ney's VI Corps infantry divisions. At the Battle of Guttstadt-Deppen on 5 and 6 June 1807, he led the 25th Light Infantry Regiment and the 27th, 50th, and 59th Line Infantry Regiments. He also directed his division at the Battle of Friedland on 14 June 1807. At 5:00 PM, Napoleon ordered the attack to begin and Ney's corps advanced with his two divisions formed in mass. With Jean Gabriel Marchand's division on the right and Bisson's on the left, the French pressed back the Russians opposing them. However, as Ney's corps advanced deep into the enemy positions, it ran into intense artillery fire which caused heavy losses. When the Russian reserve cavalry counterattacked, the soldiers of both Marchand and Bisson headed for the rear in confusion. At this moment, Napoleon brought up Claude Victor-Perrin's I Corps and it smashed the Russian left flank. As their enemies recoiled, Ney's men rallied and returned to the assault, helping to drive the Russians from Pravdinsk (Friedland) around 8:00 PM.

In 1808 Napoleon appointed Bisson a Count of the Empire. November 1808 found Bisson serving in the Peninsular War as governor of the fortress of Pamplona. By this time in his career, Bisson gained a reputation as a hard drinker. The beginning of the War of the Fifth Coalition found him leading a column of 2,050 conscripts from Italy to Bavaria over the Brenner Pass. The Tyrolean Rebellion broke out all around him. The rebels soon forced Bisson to surrender with his trapped soldiers and the eagle of the 3rd Line Infantry Regiment near Innsbruck between 11 and 13 April 1809. Another source claimed that 3,500 soldiers surrendered.

Bisson was a tall man but he also became extremely obese. He became renowned both for his bravery and for an astonishing capacity for eating and drinking. One observer claimed he could finish off eight bottles of wine for lunch while conversing pleasantly and issuing orders to his troops. Bisson died at Mantua in northern Italy on 26 July 1811. BISSON is inscribed on Column 16 of the Arc de Triomphe in Paris.
