= Barcikowo, Warmian-Masurian Voivodeship =

Barcikowo
- Village
- Location within Poland
- Coordinates: 53°57′N 20°27′E
- Country: Poland
- Voivodeship: Warmian-Masurian
- County: Olsztyn
- Gmina: Dobre Miasto

Barcikowo [bart͡ɕiˈkɔvɔ] is a village in the administrative district of Gmina Dobre Miasto, within Olsztyn County, Warmian-Masurian Voivodeship, in northern Poland.

Before 1772 the area was part of Kingdom of Poland, and in 1772–1945 it belonged to Prussia and Germany (East Prussia).
