= Podleśna, Warmian-Masurian Voivodeship =

Podleśna
- Village
- Location within Poland
- Coordinates: 53°57′N 20°30′E
- Country: Poland
- Voivodeship: Warmian-Masurian
- County: Olsztyn
- Gmina: Dobre Miasto

Podleśna [pɔdˈlɛɕna] is a village in the administrative district of Gmina Dobre Miasto, within Olsztyn County, Warmian-Masurian Voivodeship, in northern Poland.

== Notable residents ==
- August Grunau (1881–1931), German politician and Unionist
