= Waldemar Milewicz =

Polish journalist and war correspondent

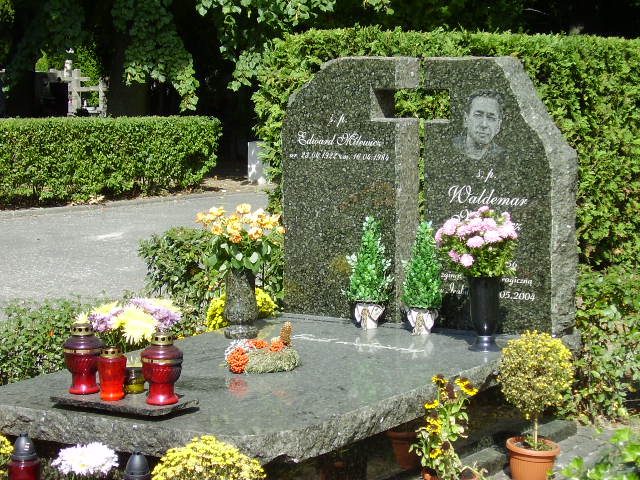
Waldemar Milewicz's gravestone at Powązki Military Cemetery, Warsaw

Waldemar Milewicz (August 20, 1956, Dobre Miasto, Poland – May 7, 2004, Latifiya, Iraq) was a Polish journalist and war correspondent.

== Life and career ==
Milewicz obtained a degree in psychology. In 1981, he began working at the public Polish Television (TVP). In 1991, he transitioned to the news division, where he focused on producing television reports and documentaries. Through his work, he extensively traveled to conflict zones across the globe, including Abkhazia, Bosnia, Cambodia, Chechnya, Ethiopia, Kosovo, Somalia and Rwanda. Notably, his documentary series titled Dziwny jest ten świat ("This is a Strange World") propelled Milewicz to becoming one of the most recognized reporters in Poland. In 2003, he reported on the Iraq War while stationed at a Polish military base. Due to declining health, Milewicz had intended to conclude his career as a war correspondent after the Iraq mission. He was killed in a drive-by shooting in Iraq by members of the extremist group Jama'at al-Tawhid wal-Jihad.

== Death ==
On May 7, 2004, the Polish TV crew's car was en route back to the Polish base camp in Najaf after conducting an interview with insurgents in Baghdad. They were traveling in a conspicuously marked press vehicle, closely trailed by a group of armed men in another car. Roughly 30 kilometres (19 mi) south of Baghdad, the assailants caught up with them and launched an attack from the rear, unleashing a barrage of bullets upon the journalists' vehicle. Milewicz was the first to be struck, and he died instantly. In a subsequent volley of gunfire, Mounir Bouamrane, a veteran Algerian-Polish editor and translator who had served TVP for approximately 15 years, also died when he exited the vehicle. Meanwhile, the crew's cameraman, Jerzy Ernst, was wounded in the arm by the second wave of gunfire while still inside the car, attempting to extract Milewicz's body. The Iraqi driver and guide, Assir Kamel al Kazzaz, managed to escape the attack unharmed.

=== Arrests ===
In 2006, Polish military intelligence detained three men, following a tip from a rival Shia militia in the Baghdad area. The alleged killers of the Polish journalists were Kifah Hamid Asman, Alim Hussein, and their cell's leader Salah Khabbas, a former Baath Party member who was later associated with al-Qaeda in Iraq. During his arrest, Khabbas offered a $100,000 bribe in exchange for his release. A suspect said that Iraqi Police officers, who had inspected the victims' car as they were leaving Baghdad, informed them of "important people" heading their direction. The detainees also confessed to several other attacks, including roadside bombings and kidnappings for ransom. They however later "vanished" after they were handed-over to the American and Iraqi forces.

=== Mistaken identity ===
On January 11, 2012, the newspaper Rzeczpospolita proposed a theory based on WSI archives discovered during verification. The theory stated that Waldemar Milewicz was killed because he shared a name with another Waldemar Milewicz, who was a member of the political cabinet of ministers of National Defence along with Romuald Szeremietiew and Bronisław Komorowski, and then a board member of Cenzin, an arms trading company. His presence likely became known when he showed his passport upon arriving at the airport. The film crew members accompanying him were thought to be camouflage, and his murderers most likely had no photo with which to verify his identity. Waldemar Milewicz often traveled to dangerous regions to report, wearing no protection while performing his job in order to facilitate communication while interviewing.

== Honours ==
Milewicz received many awards and prizes for his work, among them the SAIS-Ciba Prize for Excellence in Journalism by Johns Hopkins University in Baltimore in 1995 (for his work in Chechnya), the Polish Grand Press Journalist of the Year Award in 2001, as well as several state awards, including two Order of Polonia Restituta medals (Knight's Cross in 2002 and Officer's Cross posthumously). The urn with his ashes was rested in the Military Cemetery in Warsaw.

He was a fan of the band Depeche Mode. According to his last will, their song "I Feel You" was played during his memorial service.
