= Alexander Chechenskiy =

Russian major general

Alexander Nikolayevich Chechenskiy
- Алекса́ндр Никола́евич Чече́нский
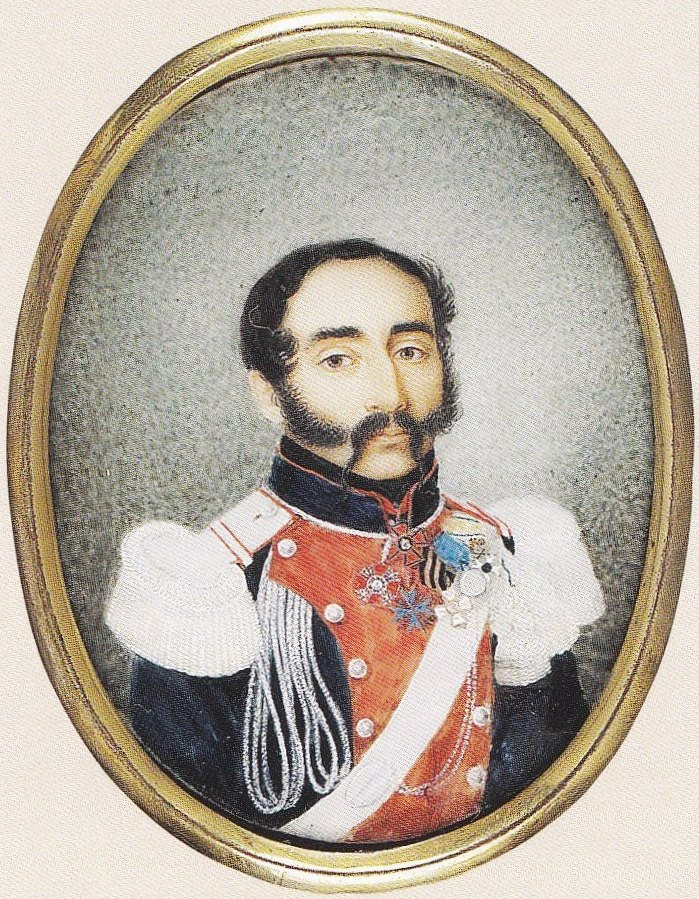
- Born: Ali; 1780; Aldi, Chechnya
- Died: 1834 (aged 53–54); Dresden, German Confederation
- Military career
- Allegiance: Russian Empire
- Service years: 1794—1824
- Rank: General Major
- Commands: Lithuanian 5th Lancers Regiment
- Conflicts: War of the Fourth Coalition; Battle of Guttstadt-Deppen; Battle of Eylau; Patriotic War of 1812; Battle of Borodino; War of the Sixth Coalition; Battle of Bautzen; Battle of Leipzig; Battle of Paris
- Awards: Order of St. George; Order of Saint Vladimir; Order of Saint Anna; Golden Weapon for Bravery

Alexander Nikolayevich Chechenskiy (born Ali; Russian: Алекса́ндр Никола́евич Чече́нский; c. 1780 – 1834) was a Russian major general in the Russian imperial cavalry of Chechen descent. He participated in the War of the Fourth Coalition and Patriotic War of 1812 among many other conflicts.

== Early life ==
Alexander was captured as a five year old during a Tsarist raid on the Chechen village of Aldi, his birth name was Ali. His mother Rahimat died in childbirth. The father of the child, Alkhazur fell in battle with the Tsarist troops attacking his aul. He was taken up by a sixteen-year-old lieutenant Nikolay Raevsky. The boy was baptised Alexander Nikolayevich Chechenskiy. He grew up in Kamenka in Little Russia with the mother of Nikolai Raevsky, Ekaterina Nikolaevna.

Alexander received an excellent home education and later graduated from the Moscow University. Then begins the military career of Alexander. With the rank of chief officer, he serves in Kizlyar in the Nizhny Novgorod Dragoon Regiment, where the commander was his adoptive father, Nikolay Raevsky. During two years of service in the Caucasus, Alexander distinguished himself in expeditions against the Qajar Empire around the Caspian and in military operations against the Ottoman Empire in the Black Sea. He was promoted to the rank of warrant officer.

== Service ==
At 24, Alexander becomes a second lieutenant. In 1805, Chechenskiy was transferred to the Grodno hussar regiment, where he commanded a half-squadron. In 1805–1807, he took part in battles with Napoleon's troops near Myshenitsy, Gutshtadt, Ackendorf, as well as in driving the enemy across the Posarzha River. The courage of Chechenskiy under Gutshtadt was marked with a golden weapon. For bravery in the battle of Preussisch-Eylau, Alexander was awarded the Order of St. Vladimir, IV degree with a bow.

By the beginning of the war with Napoleon, he was already in the rank of lieutenant colonel. In the personal diary of Denis Davydov, a hero of the partisan war, a description of Alexander Chechensky is given:

He could only be friend or foe, he had no middle ground. True, he was kind and generous in character, although his nose was aquiline, he looked formidable, and he himself was a “native of Chechnya”.

=== Patriotic War of 1812 ===
In 1812, a detachment of A. Chechensky in the cavalry corps of Ataman Platov took part in the famous Battle of Borodino. During this war, he fought from Smolensk to Poland. On December 23, 1812, by the Highest Order, he was awarded the Order of St. George IV class:

In return for the zealous service and distinction rendered in the battle against the French troops, where, being in the detachment of the partisan Davydov, near the city of Vyazma, at the village. The veil bravely attacked the strong cover of the enemy transport, consisting of 41 large wagons, and forced it to take refuge in the forest, then, with excellent fearlessness, surrounding it and hitting the enemy hard, took some of the onago prisoner, and put the rest in place; in the battle during the repulse and burning with. Yureneve of the artillery park, acted bravely, and in all cases, during the campaign, he acted with excellent courage, courage and fearlessness when the enemy was defeated.

=== Sixth Coalition War ===
In 1813, Davydov and Chechenskiy with their regiments took part in the defeat of the Saxons at Kalisz and with vanguard troops took the outskirts of Dresden. In early March, Chechensky with a small detachment besieged Dresden. The city was surrendered to him without a fight. On March 9, 1813, Colonel Denis Davydov reported to Major General Lansky:

Yesterday I made a strong reconnaissance in the vicinity of the city of Dresden. Chechenskiy, who led the Bug regiment, with his well-known courage attacked the enemy and drove him to the city, and drove him beyond the palisades.

In another report, Davydov reported:

Yesterday I undertook an intensified survey of the city of Dresden. Captain Chechenskiy, commander of the first Bug regiment, distinguished himself, this is his habit.

At Reichenbaum, Alexander's regiment defeated a French detachment, capturing a lieutenant colonel, two lower officer ranks, about a hundred privates, a regimental banner and destroyed over 150 enemy soldiers.

In 1813, Chechensky took part in the battles near the cities of Bautzen and Lucin. The new commander of the army, Barclay de Tolly, who replaced the deceased Mikhail Kutuzov in the Silesian town of Bunzlau, confers on A. Chechenskiy the rank of colonel for bravery and courage. For successful actions, he was transferred as a commander to the Life Guards Hussar Regiment. This regiment captures Osnabrück without loss, and then distinguishes itself in the battles for the cities of Delitzsch and Tolkh. Alexander Chechensky with his regiment participates in the historical battle of the nations near Leipzig.

After that, by order of the commander, the Chechen hussar regiment was sent to the Netherlands. There he, united in the province of North Brabant with three Cossack regiments, storms the fortress of Breda. Following this, Alexander Chechensky, through negotiations without a fight, occupies the heavily fortified fortress of Willemstadt with the regiment. In 1814, the Chechen fights for the capture of the French city of Soissons.

Near Lyon, Alexander's regiment participates in the battle with the superior forces of the French. Here the 14,000-strong army under the command of Prince Vorontsov saved the allied Austrian troops from the 70,000-strong army of Napoleon. On the second night of the battle, the Russian cavalry overturned and drove off the French infantry. The Chechen was wounded in the arm and leg, but did not leave the battlefield. For this battle, he was awarded the Order of St. Anna, 2nd class with diamonds. For his participation in the capture of Paris, Alexander Chechensky was awarded silver medals "For entry into Paris" and "In memory of 1812".

After the fall of Paris, Colonel Chechenskiy in the tsar's retinue, along with generals Nikolai Raevsky and Denis Davydov, participated in a solemn procession and a parade of victors on the Champs-Élysées.

After a military campaign that triumphantly ended in Paris, Alexander Chechensky was awarded the Order of St. Vladimir II degree and St. Anna II degree with diamonds. At this time, Alexander Chechensky served in the Life Guards Hussar Regiment.

== Legacy ==
On the Cathedral of Christ the Savior erected under the reign of Alexander III, among the names of other heroes, the name of Alexander Chechensky was carved as he was awarded the Order of St. George IV degree.

The name of the village of Chechen in the Pskov oblast and Chechen street in Bezhanitsy is commonly associated with the name of Alexander Chechenskiy.

On July 27, 2012 a monument was unveiled in dedication to Alexander Chechenskiy in the regional center of Bezhanitsy in the Pskov Region.

In Grozny there is a street named after Alexander Chechenskiy.

== See also ==
- Pyotr Zakharov Chechenets
