= Stary Dwór, Gmina Dobre Miasto =

Stary Dwór
- Village
- Location within Poland
- Coordinates: 53°57′27″N 20°25′47″E
- Country: Poland
- Voivodeship: Warmian-Masurian
- County: Olsztyn
- Gmina: Dobre Miasto

Stary Dwór [ˈstarɨ ˈdvur] is a village in the administrative district of Gmina Dobre Miasto, within Olsztyn County, Warmian-Masurian Voivodeship, in northern Poland.
