= Oskar Negt =

German philosopher (1934–2024)

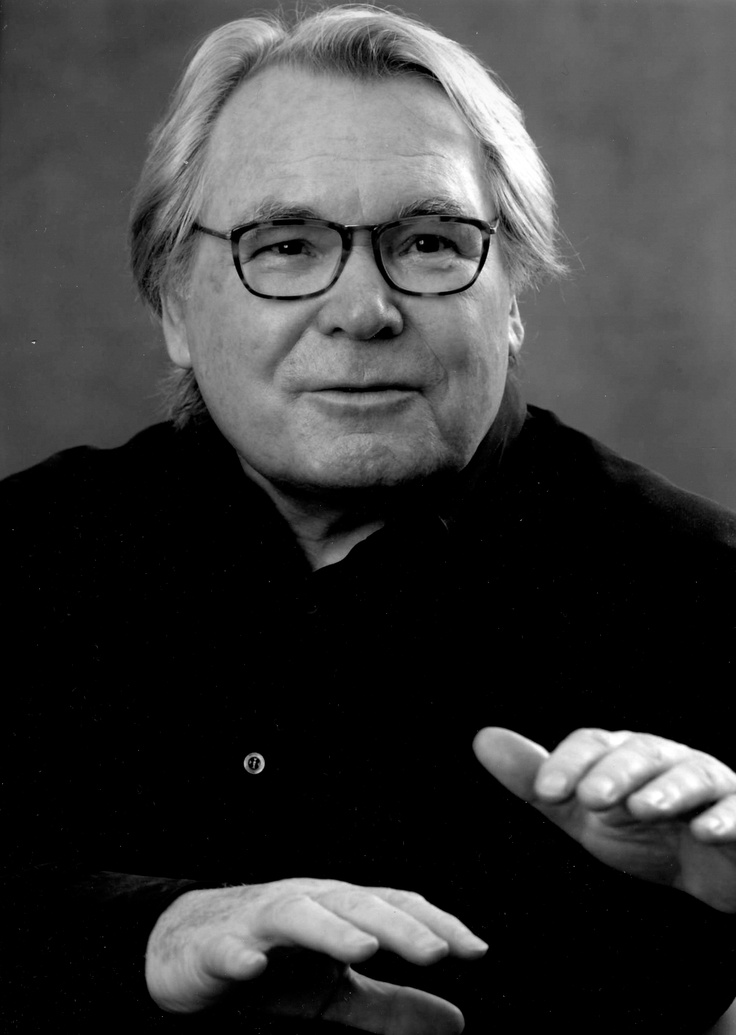
- Negt in 2007
- Born: 1 August 1934; Kapheim, East Prussia, Germany
- Died: 2 February 2024 (aged 89); Hanover, Lower Saxony, Germany
- Occupations: Philosopher; Critical social theorist
- Organizations: Sozialistisches Büro in Offenbach; University of Hanover
- Awards: August Bebel Prize

Education
- Education: University of Göttingen; University of Frankfurt

Oskar Reinhard Negt (German: [ˈneːkt]; 1 August 1934 – 2 February 2024) was a German philosopher and critical social theorist. He was a professor of sociology in Hanover from 1972 to 2002, regarded as one of Germany's most prominent social scientists.

A member of the Socialist German Students' Union, Negt studied philosophy and sociology in Frankfurt with Theodor Adorno, and was an assistant of Jürgen Habermas. He was one of the mentors of the Außerparlamentarische Opposition, and when the protest movement fragmented, tried as leader of the Sozialistisches Büro in Offenbach to establish an "over-factional consciousness". Negt's focus was on the education of workers as political action, believing that democracy was a form of government that had to be learned. He is known for his collaboration with the filmmaker and visual artist Alexander Kluge, including books that were translated into English as Public Sphere and Experience and History and Obstinacy.

== Life and career ==
Negt was born in Kapheim near Königsberg on 1 August 1934, the son of a small farmer and the youngest child of seven. His father was involved in the Social Democratic Party (SPD) during World War II, facing pressure under the Nazi regime. In 1944, Negt and two of his sisters were separated from their parents and displaced to Denmark following the Red Army's invasion of Königsberg. In Denmark, they stayed in an internment camp for two and a half years. When the camp doors were finally reopened, Negt and his sisters were reunited with their parents in Soviet occupation sector of Berlin after having been placed in quarantine near Rostock on their return to Germany. Negt's childhood was deeply affected by missing out on early development, with no exposure to schooling. In 1951, with rising political pressure on Negt's family due to his father's involvement in the SPD, the family fled to West Berlin, where they would spend six months as asylum seekers. In 1955, the Negt family settled into Oldenburg in Lower Saxony.

After his Abitur in 1955, Negt followed a wish of his father and studied law at the University of Göttingen; he found the commitments entailed by membership in the local Burschenschaft overly burdensome. He later left, joined the Socialist German Students' Union (SDS), and enrolled in the Universität Frankfurt (now Goethe University Frankfurt) for the study of sociology and philosophy with Max Horkheimer and Theodor W. Adorno, He met Jürgen Habermas there who was impressed with one of Negt's class papers. His dissertation in philosophy, supervised by Adorno, was titled Strukturbeziehungen zwischen den Gesellschaftslehren Comtes und Hegels (Structural relationships between Comte's and Hegel's social theories). Negt was offered a position as a research assistant for Habermas (on the topic of Marxism and the SDS) at the University of Heidelberg in 1961, where he wrote his habilitation about the education of workers (Arbeiterbildung) in 1968. In 1968 Negt upset his mentor Habermas by editing a collection of essays on him (titled The Left answers Jurgen Habermas), some of which were highly critical.

Negt worked towards a collaboration of marxists and the labour unions. In the 1968 student movement he was one of the mentors of the Außerparlamentarische Opposition, and later director of the Sozialistisches Büro in Offenbach, trying to influence an überfraktionelles Bewußtsein, an "over-factional consciousness" of the fragmenting protest movement, with the goal not to train professional revolutionaries, but to accompany revolutionaries in their professions.

Negt held a chair of sociology at the Technische Hochschule Hannover from 1970, called by the minister of culture of Lower Saxony, Peter von Oertzen, who was then in the process of expanding the technical school to a university (later called the Leibniz University Hannover). He founded one of the first reform schools in Germany, the Glockseeschule in Hanover, in 1972. The same year he refused solidarity with the Red Army Faction (RAF), which took courage at the time. He was emerited in 2002.

Negt published his autobiography in two instalments in 2016 and 2019, titled respectively Überlebensglück (Survivors' Luck: An Autobiographical Search for Tracks) and Erfahrungsspuren (Tracks of Experience: An Autobiographical Thought-Journey). He also collaborated with the filmmaker Alexander Kluge on three films about post-socialist Europe. Negt's work with Kluge has been described as "highly unconventional" but significant in "an attempt to reinstate the human body to its rightful place in critical theory."

=== Personal life ===
Negt died in Hanover on 2 February 2024 after a long illness, at age 89.

== Intellectual influences ==
Negt's work is said to be difficult to classify due to the enormous range of influences found in it from so many texts and philosophers. These include Immanuel Kant, Georg Hegel, Karl Marx, Auguste Comte, and some of the major Western Marxists. He drew on work in labour sociology, organisational theory, political journalism and more. Negt's primary concerns relate to labour, teaching, and politics.

Negt was brought up as the son of a small farmer and a member of the Social Democratic Party, and this "rural and... proletarian existence" led him to have ties with SPD causes, including trade unions. These experiences led him to feel that while standard education for union members in metal working factories in Germany was sufficient for teaching legal questions, it was insufficient in political education. Negt thus understood genuine education to be inherently political, because democracy must be learned, making education existential for a democratic society. Negt was thus suspicious of the ideology and logic of capital and the market replacing all other forms of social reality. This informed his views on education as the holistic development of the person, limited not only to "processing knowledge and information" but also the ability to deal with emotions, to compromise, negotiate, and share with others. Thus for Negt, "good political education" means that the students can "think for themselves."

=== Work with Alexander Kluge ===
Negt was especially known for his public interventions in politics in collaboration with the artist Alexander Kluge. Their seminal work Public Sphere and Experience was an analysis of the limits of the bourgeois public sphere, which shaped public opposition.

== Awards ==
In 2011 Negt was awarded the August Bebel Prize for his political work.

== Publications ==
=== In English ===
- The Misery of Bourgeois Democracy in Germany. Telos 34 (Winter 1974). New York: Telos Press.
- (with Kluge) Public Sphere and Experience: Analysis of the Bourgeois and Proletarian Public Sphere, Verso; Reprint edition (2 February 2016) Originally issued as Public Sphere and Experience: Toward an Analysis of the Bourgeois and Proletarian Public Sphere (Theory & History of Literature) by Univ of Minnesota Pr; First edition (1 December 1993).
- Adult Education and European Identity. Policy Futures in Education. 6 (6): 744–756. (2013)
- (with Kluge) History and Obstinacy, Zone Books (11 April 2014)

=== In German ===
Negt's complete works were published by Steidl Verlag in twelve volumes in 2016.

- Strukturbeziehungen zwischen den Gesellschaftslehren Comtes und Hegels. (dissertation) Frankfurt 1964.
- Soziologische Phantasie und exemplarisches Lernen. Zur Theorie der Arbeiterbildung. (habilitation) Frankfurt 1968.
- Politik als Protest. Reden und Aufsätze zur antiautoritären Bewegung. Frankfurt 1971.
- (with Kluge) Öffentlichkeit und Erfahrung. Zur Organisationsanalyse von bürgerlicher und proletarischer Öffentlichkeit. Frankfurt 1972.
- Keine Demokratie ohne Sozialismus. Über den Zusammenhang von Politik, Geschichte und Moral. Frankfurt. 1976.
- (with Kluge): Geschichte und Eigensinn. Geschichtliche Organisation der Arbeitsvermögen – Deutschland als Produktionsöffentlichkeit – Gewalt des Zusammenhangs. Frankfurt 1981.
- Lebendige Arbeit, enteignete Zeit. Politische und kulturelle Dimensionen des Kampfes um die Arbeitszeit. Frankfurt /New York 1984.
- Alfred Sohn-Rethel. Bremen 1988.
- Modernisierung im Zeichen des Drachen. China und der europäische Mythos der Moderne. Reisetagebuch und Gedankenexperimente. Frankfurt 1988.
- Die Herausforderung der Gewerkschaften. Plädoyers für die Erweiterung ihres politischen und kulturellen Mandats. Frankfurt/New York 1989.
- (with Kluge) Maßverhältnisse des Politischen: 15 Vorschläge zum Unterscheidungsvermögen. Frankfurt 1992
- Kältestrom. Göttingen 1994. ISBN 3-88243-358-2
- Unbotmäßige Zeitgenossen. Annäherungen und Erinnerungen. Frankfurt 1994.
- Achtundsechzig. Politische Intellektuelle und die Macht. Göttingen 1995.
- Kindheit und Schule in einer Welt der Umbrüche. Göttingen 1997.
- (with Hans Werner Dannowski) Königsberg–Kaliningrad: Reise in die Stadt Kants und Hamanns. Göttingen 1998.
- Warum SPD? 7 Argumente für einen nachhaltigen Macht- und Politikwechsel. Göttingen 1998.
- (with Kluge): Der unterschätzte Mensch. Frankfurt 2001. (* ISBN 3-88243-786-3
- Kant und Marx. Ein Epochengespräch. Göttingen 2003.
- Wozu noch Gewerkschaften? Eine Streitschrift. Steidl Verlag, 2004, ISBN 3-86521-165-8
- Die Faust-Karriere. Vom verzweifelten Intellektuellen zum gescheiterten Unternehmer. Göttingen 2006. ISBN 3-86521-188-7
