= Public opposition =

Social activity opposing establishment opinion

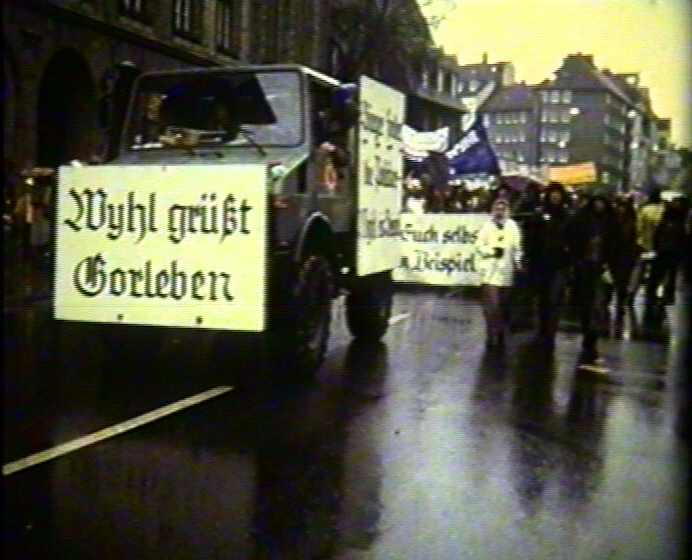
Anti-nuclear demonstration in Hanover 1979

Public opposition describes a form of social activity that deliberately opposes establishment opinion in the public sphere in order to raise public awareness of topics, problems or social groups that appear to be neglected or oppressed. As with the public sphere, public opposition is in direct opposition to the private sphere — at its core, it is about occupying public spaces where people can gather and get informed. The development of various means of communication has decisively influenced the forms and possibilities of informational transfer.

Demonstrations are the oldest and still current means for people to draw attention to themselves, their situation or their concerns. Here, no (technological) means of communication is needed to convey messages - this can be done by shouting, chanting or displaying posters - and the messages will come across. Advocacy journalism also attempts to draw attention to topics that are underrepresented in the mass media.

== Theory of public opposition ==
=== Origin of the Term ===
The term "public opposition" was first used in Germany in the 1970s. The term arose in discourse for alternative opinions on politics and society which were not properly publicised and could not be published by established media institutions. The protests of 1968 showed how ineffectual the direct action of the movement was after their first, even violent, actions, such as blocking the delivery of newspapers from the publishers Axel Springer SE. These experiences gave rise to the idea of using technical media to produce their own material. From 1970 onwards an attempt was made to investigate these confrontations and disputes within their theoretical and historical context. The development of a new form of "mass media", particularly television, played a crucial part. The work Public Sphere and Experience, written by Oskar Negt and Alexander Kluge in 1972 referred to the philosopher Jürgen Habermas, who published "The Structural Transformation of the Public Sphere" in 1962, and which was formative for this development.

=== Historical Background ===
Negt and Kluge argued that early forms of public representation primarily served ruling elites, while later middle-class publics adapted these forms and altered their function in line with changing social conditions.

Habermas chose the term "plebeian public sphere" - derived from the mixed urban lower classes, who, during the French Revolution, undertook attempts to develop a public sphere appropriate for them.

Oskar Negt and Alexander Kluge chose “the term proletarian public because it is […] not a variant of the middle-class public, but rather a historically based […] completely different view of the overall social context.“ In the preface to Öffentlichkeit und Erfahrung the authors define their interest in "investigating the contradictory tendencies arising within advanced capitalist society with regard to the conditions for the emergence of public opposition."

=== Public opposition as an intermediary stage ===
In the reception of the work, particularly in the university field, the term “public opposition” stuck. It has survived to this day, although Negt and Kluge described public opposition as an “early form of the proletarian public” – a concept that did not survive the change in terminology. A reduction to the opposing view or a mere representation of oppositional thinking was not the authors’ intention. Furthermore, the “proletarian public” should also be more than a way to implement the interests of a particular social class: they were concerned – looking to the future, with a “transformation process” to achieve “the alliance capabilities between the social forces which are able to carry out the full scope of the reorganisation of our future society”.

On this basis, public opposition since the 1970s developed primarily in limited and fragmented forms. Within youth and protest movements, and later the New Social Movements, technological developments contributed to a decentralisation of the public sphere. This process supported the emergence of independent spaces of communication, particularly through cultural activity, and later through online environments. Despite these developments, their broader social implications and theoretical significance have not been systematically analysed since the work of Negt and Kluge.

== Practice of Public Opposition ==
=== Public Relations in the Protest Movement ===
The first activities in the Federal Republic of Germany and West Berlin that one can place in the bounds of public opposition occurred during the West German student movement. The periodicals Agit 883 and "Langer Marsch" (The long walk - translator's suggestion) were known nationwide. The most important medium was the leaflet. Since there were not yet any simple printing or copying methods, the production of magazines was costly and in most cases only possible in connection with institutions or trade unions. This applied also to audiovisual media, at that time the 16mm film. Documentaries were mainly made at the German Film and Television Academy Berlin (DFFB) and the Institute for Film Design in Ulm. A broadcast on television was only possible in rare cases. One platform was the International Short Film Festival in Oberhausen. In most cases screenings were organised by the creators themselves. In the later course of the West German student movement, the often well-financed K-Gruppen (communist groups) and organisations with close ties to the GDR emerged, which had sufficient production resources for the public relations of their party.

=== Alternative movement of the 1970s ===
Inspired by the protest movement, the generations after 1968 also developed new methods of media production, which was, however, hardly agitational and often initially served to help groups or scenes understand themselves. The technical development created new means of production – such as Super 8 film, which succeeded 16mm film – and also music equipment for bands, studios and event organisers (youth centres) became affordable.

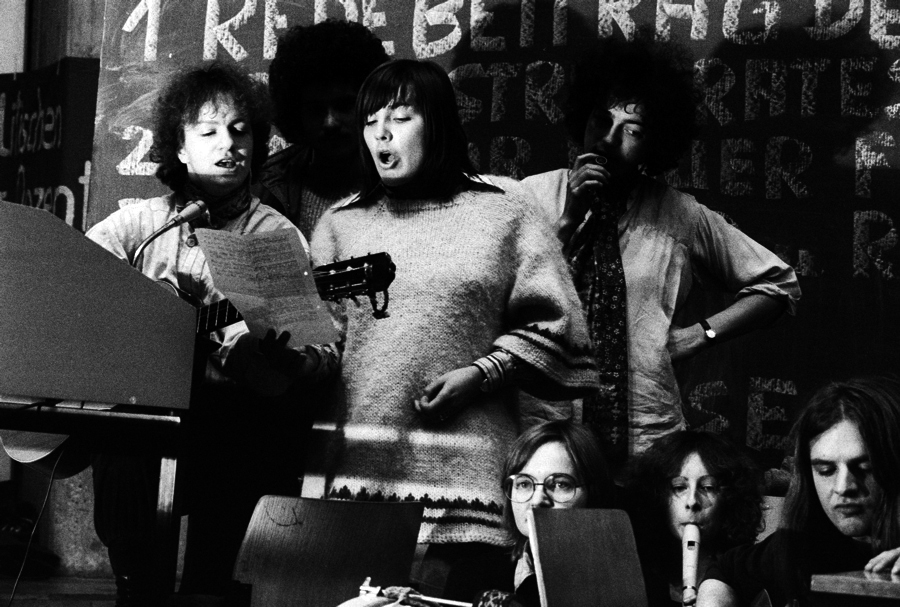
The band Unistreik in the auditorium of Technische Universität Berlin in 1977

The university strikes in Berlin and the Federal Republic in 1976/1977 subsequently led to a boom in start-up projects. Meanwhile, the ‘unorganised’ with their majority and experience in event organisation and public relations were able to break the dominance of the K-Gruppen (Communist Groups). It was the time when people left universities and established themselves in the city districts, known as the 'Kiez' (Tunix-congress 1978). First in the university centres and soon in every larger city, so-called 'Stattzeitungen' (German wordplay for 'anti-newspapers') such as the Blatt in Munich, Klenkes in Aachen, or De Schnüss in Bonn were published. They reached print runs of up to 20,000 and provided a forum for the different groups that were not given a voice in the local press. An abundance of small and alternative newspapers appeared in the German-speaking world. In 1974 Peter Engel and W. Christian Schmitt were able to identify around 250 new alternative newspapers that had appeared since 1965. In 1986, the directory of alternative newspapers published by the 'information service for the distribution of omitted news' (ID) listed around 600 more or less regularly published newspapers and magazines.

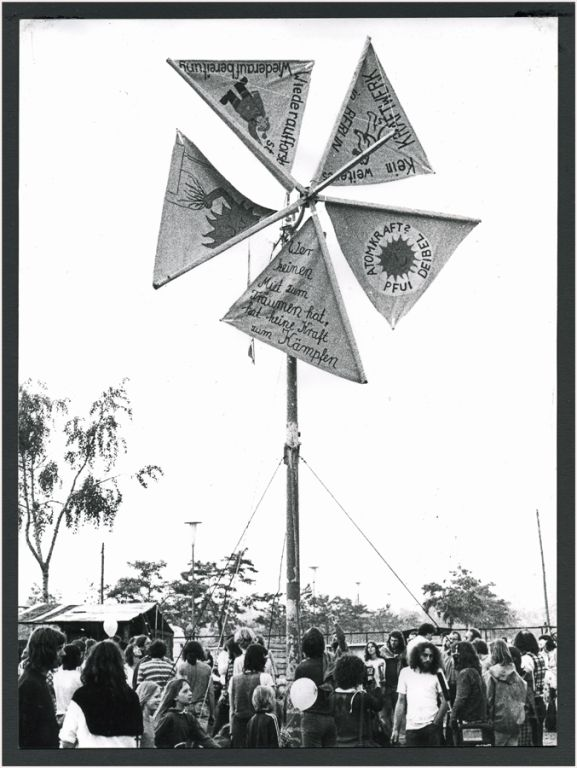
Poster for the film by the Berlin media workshop 1980

The alternative movement achieved success with the six-week-long festival of the environment at the radio tower in Berlin in the summer of 1978, which was attended by tens of thousands of interested citizens. The film about the event, made by an associated group, the Berlin media workshop, titled If you do not have the courage to dream, you have no strength to fight, was screened in February 1980 at the Forum for Young Film at the Berlin International Film Festival.

=== Social Movements ===
Additionally, a lot of cabaret acts and theatre groups were founded during this phase (for example the Frankfurter Fronttheater and Die Drei Tornados, among others). The term public opposition now detached itself from its limited political purpose and also incorporated cultural work as well as subject-orientated activities, which became necessary in environmental engagement. The spectrum ranged from Vergangenheitsbewältigung (the struggle to overcome the past) to environmental protection and the anti-nuclear movement. The specialisation allowed the development of respective magazines for the women's movement, tenants' association, environmental groups and eco-groups.

It was not only in Berlin that the possibility of using autonomous spaces was recognised (Kreuzberg) and then extended due to the widespread phenomenon of squatting.

After the movements dwindled, the projects and opposing media either agreed to disagree, fused, or disbanded, for various reasons. To survive, many had to undergo a process of commercialisation. Examples are alternative newspapers like Ketchup from Heidelberg or Tip and Zitty in Berlin. This also affected the contents. With the internet, public opposition also shifted to the web. By the late twentieth century, the term fell out of common usage and is now primarily employed in historical and theoretical discussions.

=== Public opposition in the Eastern Bloc ===
The Russian term samizdat (literally: self-publishing) referred to the spread of alternative "grey" literature that did not conform to the system in the Soviet Union and later on in other parts of the Eastern Bloc. was spread via non-official channels, for example, copying by hand, typing or photocopying. Samizdat existed to a significant extent in the Soviet Union, Poland, the GDR, Czechoslovakia and Hungary.

== Forms of public opposition ==
In addition to demonstrations, the preferred media of public opposition has been printed works (books, brochures, newspapers, posters and flyers) and audiovisual products (films, videos, photos, music on records, tapes and cassettes). This also included public performances: Street theatre, artistic or politically motivated performances, musical performances and concerts. With these works and actions, "public opposition" was created.

=== Radio, film and video ===
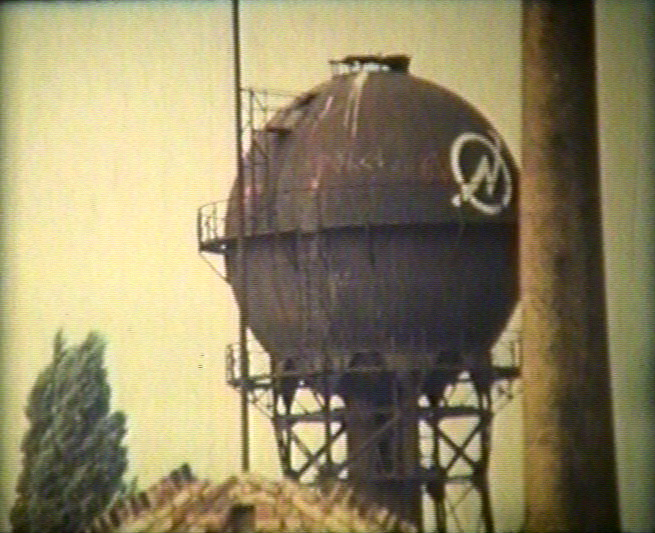
Radio channel hideout of squatters on the Gleisdreieck-premisses in Berlin 1981

Additional media became cheaper and more accessible to the opposing public "from below" with the technological advancements of the 1980s. First illegal, later legal, alternative radio channels such as Radio Dreyeckland and Radio Z in Nuremberg began to spring up. Thanks to the Super-8- film and video technology, even some private films could be made for little money. The Super-8 film rental Contre-jour and video groups like the Freiburg Media Workshop, the Hamburg Media Education Centre e.V. in Hamburg and the Autofocus Videowerkstatt e.V in Berlin were formed.

=== The Computer Scene ===
The German-speaking Bulletin board system scene originates largely from the new socialist movements. Computer Activists took on themes like free access to the Internet as well as data protection and created their own Internet culture.

With the spread of the Internet, public opposition found a new forum. A citizen journalism of its own arose online, web users gave themselves names such as Netizen and rules like Netiquette were established.

== New theoretical approaches ==
In an interview, Alexander Kluge described the potential of the internet as revolutionary: "The current tv or radio media content is broadcast hierarchically from above. As long as the online system is not in the hands of corporations, then the direction can be reversed.[…] The internet manifests its potential as a raw material. It has not yet been fully formed. The heads of programme directors are deeply stuffed with their thoroughly conservative mandatory programme, including their ideology. […] It is too soon to celebrate, yet on YouTube, people make Enzensberger's theory of mass media become reality. […] A revolution is taking place online. […] YouTube has many scattered but brilliant things, which are thoroughly new created without taking any instructions from above. This type of indirect public sphere poses a new challenge […]“[1]
