= Wichrowo =

- Village
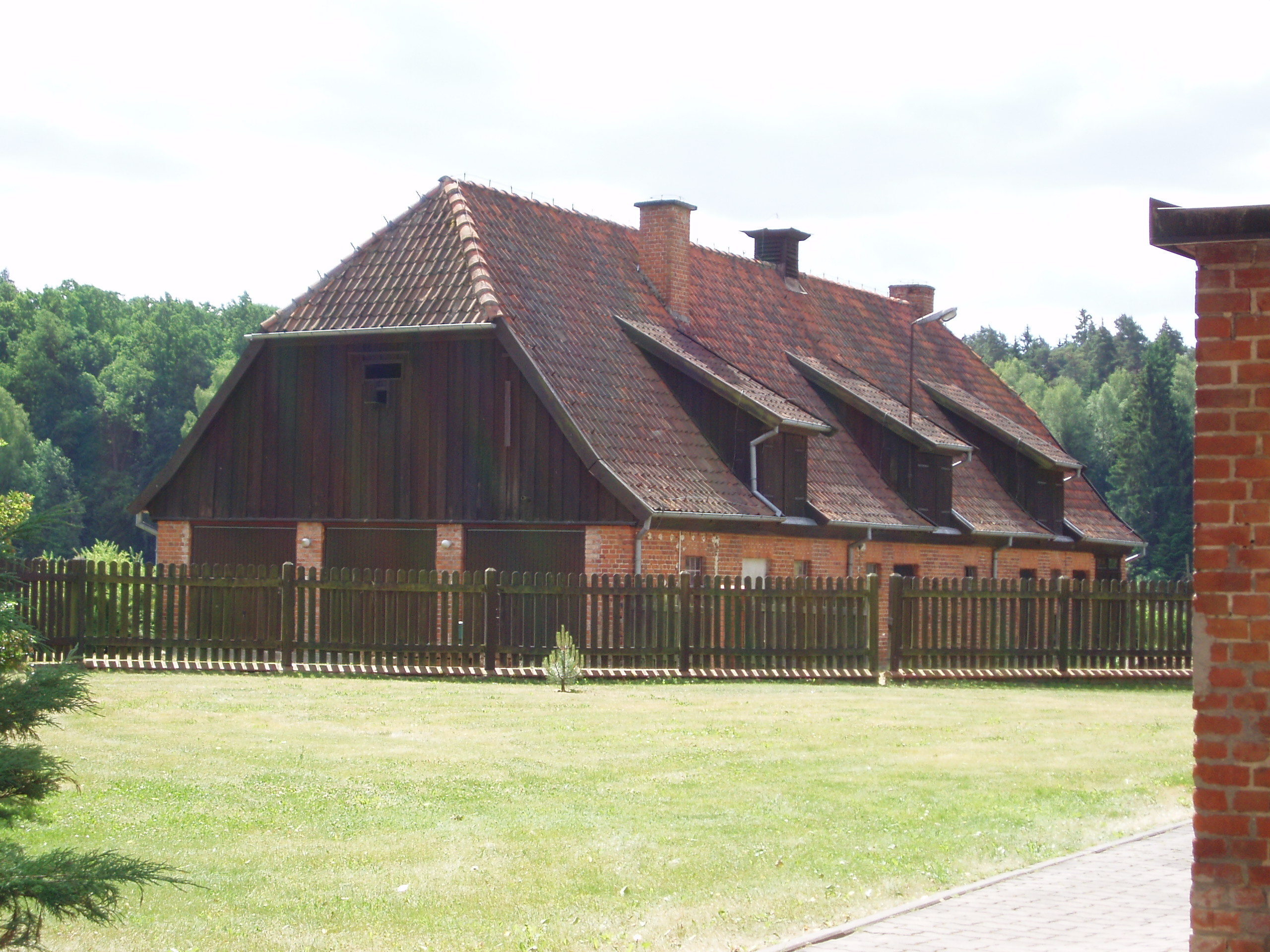
- buildings of the Wichrowo forestry inspectorate, Dobre Miasto commune

- Location within Poland
- Coordinates: 54°01′35″N 20°26′01″E
- Country: Poland
- Voivodeship: Warmian-Masurian
- County: Olsztyn
- Gmina: Dobre Miasto

Wichrowo [viˈxrɔvɔ] is a village in the administrative district of Gmina Dobre Miasto, within Olsztyn County, Warmian-Masurian Voivodeship, in northern Poland.
