= Nowa Wieś Mała, Olsztyn County =

Nowa Wieś Mała
- Village
- Location within Poland
- Coordinates: 53°59′25″N 20°20′57″E
- Country: Poland
- Voivodeship: Warmian-Masurian
- County: Olsztyn
- Gmina: Dobre Miasto

Nowa Wieś Mała [ˈnɔva ˈvjɛɕ ˈmawa] is a village in the administrative district of Gmina Dobre Miasto, within Olsztyn County, Warmian-Masurian Voivodeship, in northern Poland.
