= Urbanowo, Pomeranian Voivodeship =

Village in Pomeranian Voivodeship, Poland

Urbanowo
- Village
- Location within Poland
- Coordinates: 53°53′33″N 18°31′52″E
- Country: Poland
- Voivodeship: Pomeranian
- County: Starogard
- Gmina: Bobowo
- Time zone: UTC+1 (CET)
  - Summer (DST): UTC+2 (CEST)
- Vehicle registration: GST

Urbanowo [urbaˈnɔvɔ] is a village in the administrative district of Gmina Bobowo, within Starogard County, Pomeranian Voivodeship, in northern Poland. It is located in the ethnocultural region of Kociewie in the historic region of Pomerania.
