= Łęgno, Warmian-Masurian Voivodeship =

Łęgno
- Village
- Location within Poland
- Coordinates: 53°59′46″N 20°18′50″E
- Country: Poland
- Voivodeship: Warmian-Masurian
- County: Olsztyn
- Gmina: Dobre Miasto
- Population: 400

Łęgno [ˈwɛnɡnɔ] is a village in the administrative district of Gmina Dobre Miasto, within Olsztyn County, Warmian-Masurian Voivodeship, in northern Poland.
