= Urbanowo, Warmian-Masurian Voivodeship =

Urbanowo
- Village
- Location within Poland
- Coordinates: 54°4′33″N 20°25′18″E
- Country: Poland
- Voivodeship: Warmian-Masurian
- County: Olsztyn
- Gmina: Dobre Miasto

Urbanowo [urbaˈnɔvɔ] is a village in the administrative district of Gmina Dobre Miasto, within Olsztyn County, Warmian-Masurian Voivodeship, in northern Poland.
