= Kunik (surname) =

Kunik is a Jewish surname derived from the Yiddish "Kune" which means clan, family. Notable people with the surname include:

- Matúš Kuník (born 1997), Slovak footballer
- Ran Kunik (born 1968), Israeli politician and table tennis player

== See also ==
- Kunin (surname)
