= Kunik, Poland =

Kunik
- Village
- Location within Poland
- Coordinates: 54°00′25″N 20°22′37″E
- Country: Poland
- Voivodeship: Warmian-Masurian
- County: Olsztyn
- Gmina: Dobre Miasto

Kunik [ˈkunik] is a village in the administrative district of Gmina Dobre Miasto, within Olsztyn County, Warmian-Masurian Voivodeship, in northern Poland.
