= Knopin =

- Village
- Location within Poland
- Coordinates: 53°57′29″N 20°24′21″E
- Country: Poland
- Voivodeship: Warmian-Masurian
- County: Olsztyn
- Gmina: Dobre Miasto
- Population: 100

Knopin [ˈknɔpin] is a village in the administrative district of Gmina Dobre Miasto, within Olsztyn County, Warmian-Masurian Voivodeship, in northern Poland.
