= Głotowo =

- Village
- Location within Poland
- Coordinates: 53°57′N 20°21′E
- Country: Poland
- Voivodeship: Warmian-Masurian
- County: Olsztyn
- Gmina: Dobre Miasto
- Population: 450

Głotowo [ɡwɔˈtɔvɔ] is a village in the administrative district of Gmina Dobre Miasto, within Olsztyn County, Warmian-Masurian Voivodeship, in northern Poland.

When the area was Christianised through the Northern Crusades, Głotowo developed into an important Christian pilgrimage site.
