= Dedieu =

Dedieu is a surname. Notable people with the surname include:

- Isabelle Dedieu (born 1956), French film editor
- Jean Dedieu (c. 1645–1727), French sculptor
- Jean-Pierre Dedieu (born 1948), French historian
- Virginie Dedieu (born 1979), French synchronized swimmer
