= Christine Caldwell Ames =

American historian

Christine Caldwell Ames is a historian and professor of history at the University of South Carolina. Her research interests include the history of Christianity, heresy and the Inquisition, and interreligious relations.

== Selected works ==
- Medieval Heresies - Christianity, Judaism, and Islam (2015)
- Righteous Persecution: Inquisition, Dominicans, and Christianity in the Middle Ages (2009)
