= Orneta =

Town in Warmian-Masurian Voivodeship, Poland

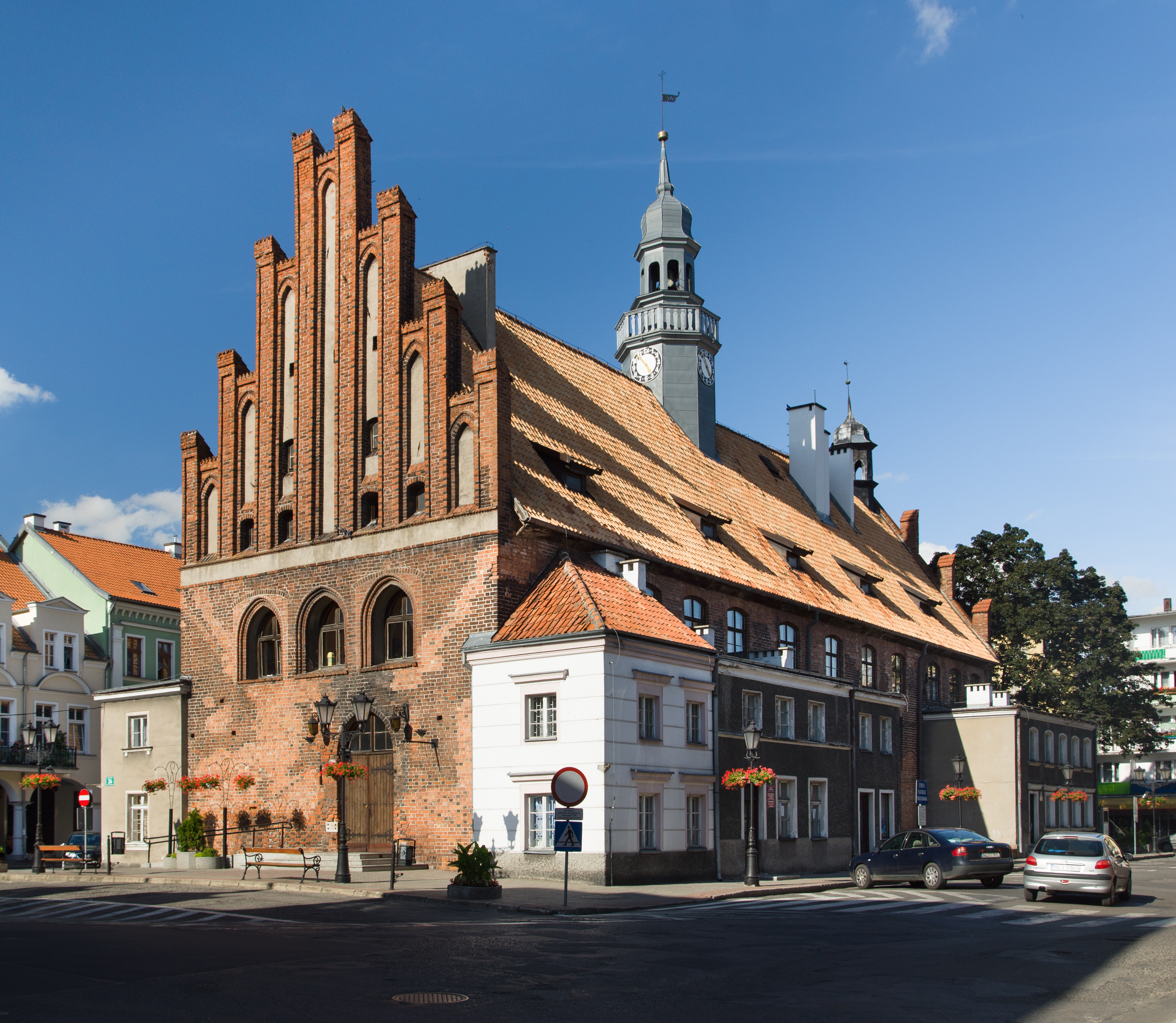
- Town hall

- Flag Coat of arms
- Interactive map of Orneta
- Location within Poland
- Coordinates: 54°6′46″N 20°7′54″E
- Country: Poland
- Voivodeship: Warmian-Masurian
- County: Lidzbark
- Gmina: Orneta

Area
  - Total: 9.63 km^{2} (3.72 sq mi)

Population (2016)
  - Total: 8,951
  - Density: 929/km^{2} (2,410/sq mi)
- Time zone: UTC+1 (CET)
  - Summer (DST): UTC+2 (CEST)
- Postal code: 11-130
- Vehicle registration: NLI
- Website: www.orneta.pl

Orneta (Note: [ɔrˈnɛta]; German: Wormditt, Prussian: Wurmedītin) is a town in northern Poland, with a total population of 8,951 (2016). It is situated in the Lidzbark County in the Warmian-Masurian Voivodeship and within the historical region of Warmia.

== History ==
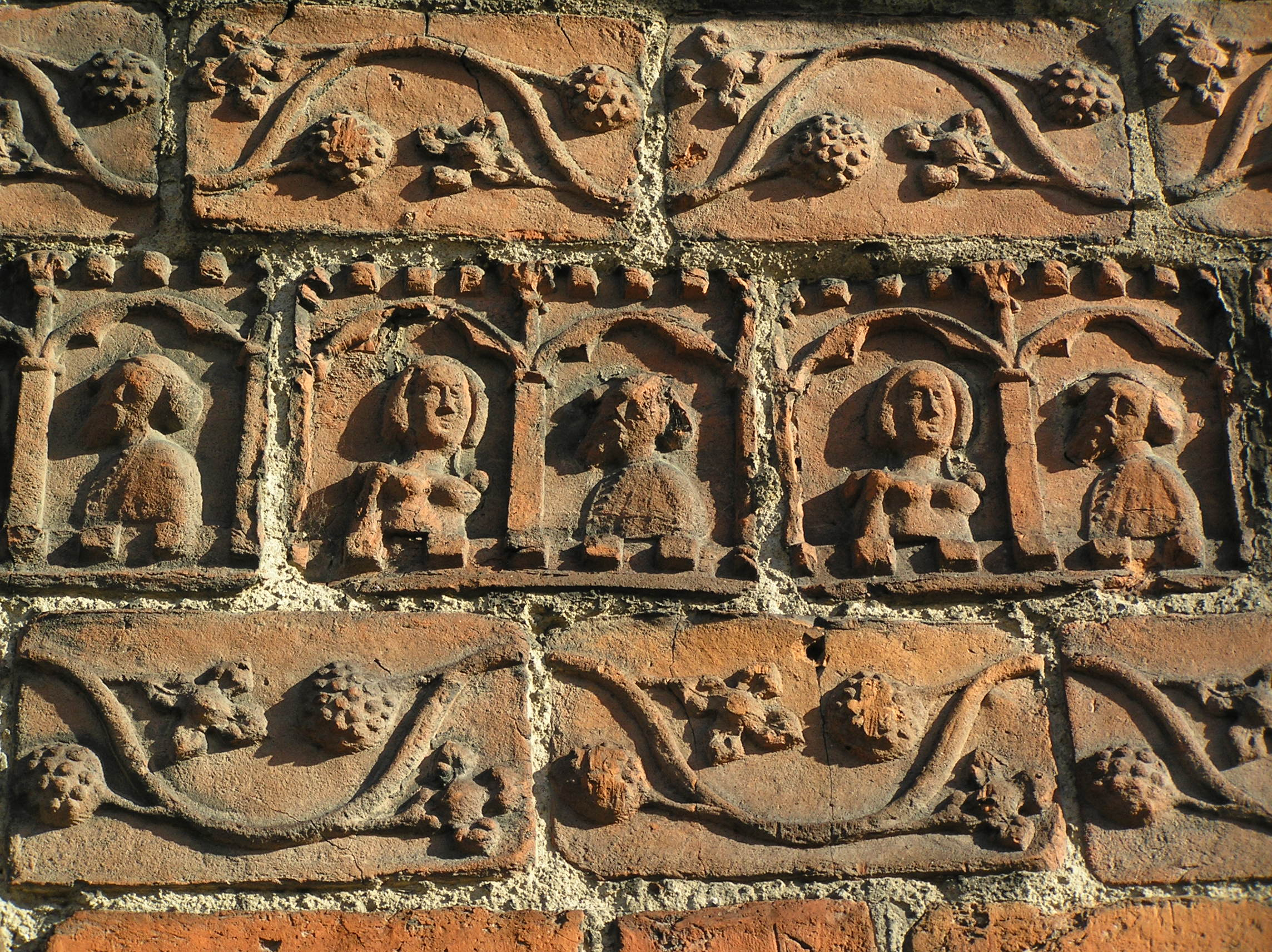
Details of the Gothic Saint John the Baptist church

Orneta, said to have been a village of the ancient Old Prussians, was first mentioned in 1308. The town coat of arms depicts the worm (English: worm, dragon; German: Worms, Wurm as in Tatzelwurm, Lindworm). The bishop of Warmia Eberhard von Neiße ordered the building of a new town which received town rights in 1313 and was mainly populated by settlers from Silesia.

In 1341–1350, it was the seat of the Bishops of Warmia. In 1440, the town joined the anti-Teutonic Prussian Confederation, at the request of which Polish King Casimir IV Jagiellon signed the act of incorporation of the region and town into the Kingdom of Poland in 1454. In 1538 Orneta was visited by astronomer Nicolaus Copernicus, who accompanied the newly elected Warmian bishop, Polish diplomat Jan Dantyszek during his tour of Warmia. The town was annexed by the Kingdom of Prussia in the First Partition of Poland in 1772, and subsequently it became part of Germany in 1871.

During World War II, the Germans established three prisoner of war forced labour camps in the town. After Germany's defeat in the war, the town became again part of Poland.

In May 2010, a procession with the coffin of Nicolaus Copernicus stopped in Orneta and official ceremonies took place before the great astronomer was buried again in Frombork.

== Legend of the dragon ==
According to some legend, many ages ago there lived a dragon that devoured not only animals, but also women and children. Many knights who tried to set the town free from the disaster were killed in a struggle with the monster. At last one of the knights managed to combat the dragon. Reminiscences of the legend are reflected in Orneta's crest. The oldest image of the crest is known from the sealing wax on the document from 1388. It represents the dragon biting its own tail. In the frame of the seal there is only a fragment of an inscription which says" S.BV.MDIT." However, on the seals from the 15th century, a juridical seal from the 16th century as well as the seal of the town secretary from 18th century there is the dragon coiled, lying on its own back.

== Transport ==
Orneta lies on the intersection of multiple voivodeship roads (528, 513, 507).

Orneta has a station on the Braniewo-Olsztyn railway line.

== Sports ==
The local football club is Błękitni Orneta. It competes in the lower leagues.

== Gallery ==
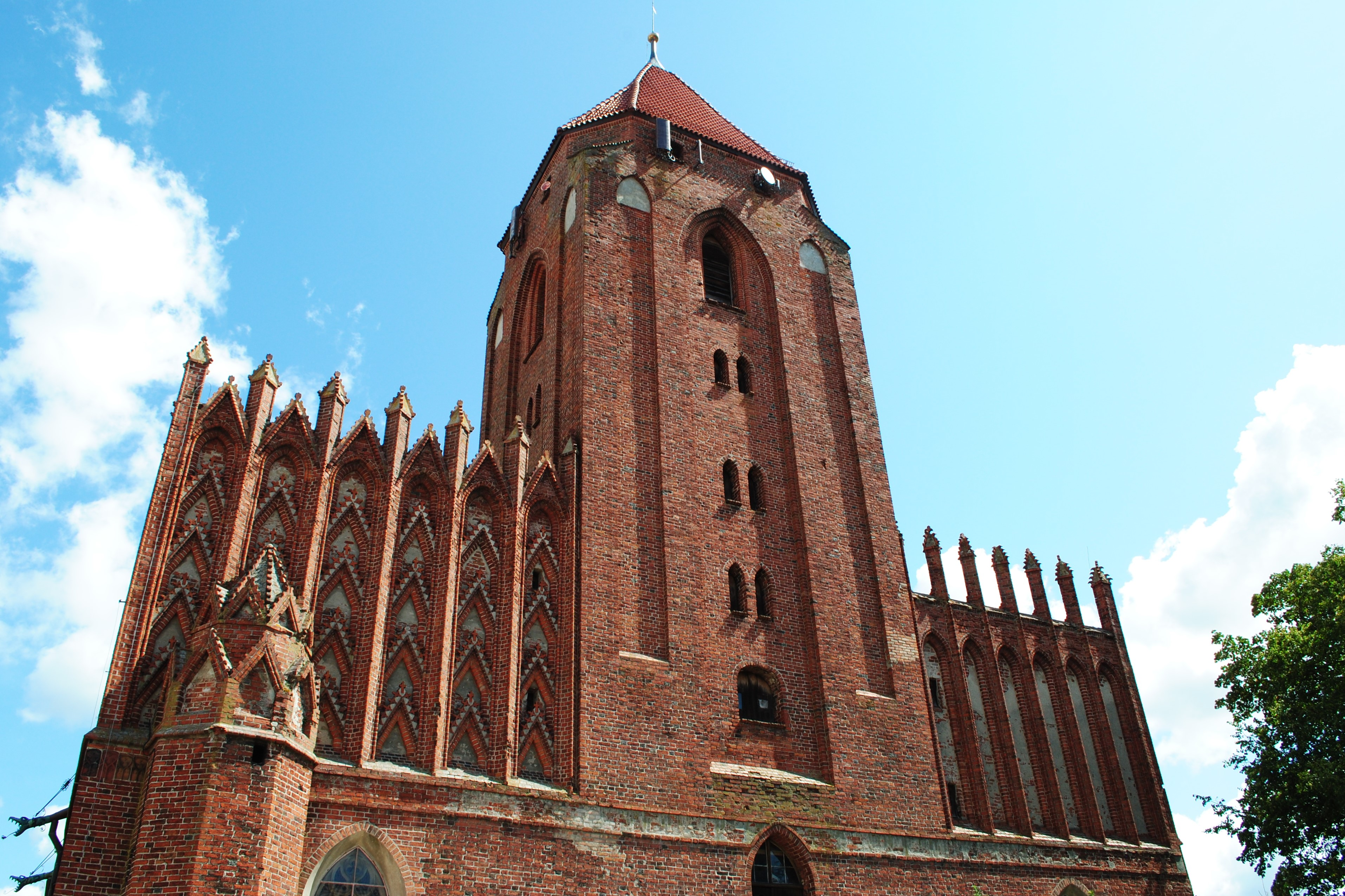
Saint John the Baptist church (Gothic)

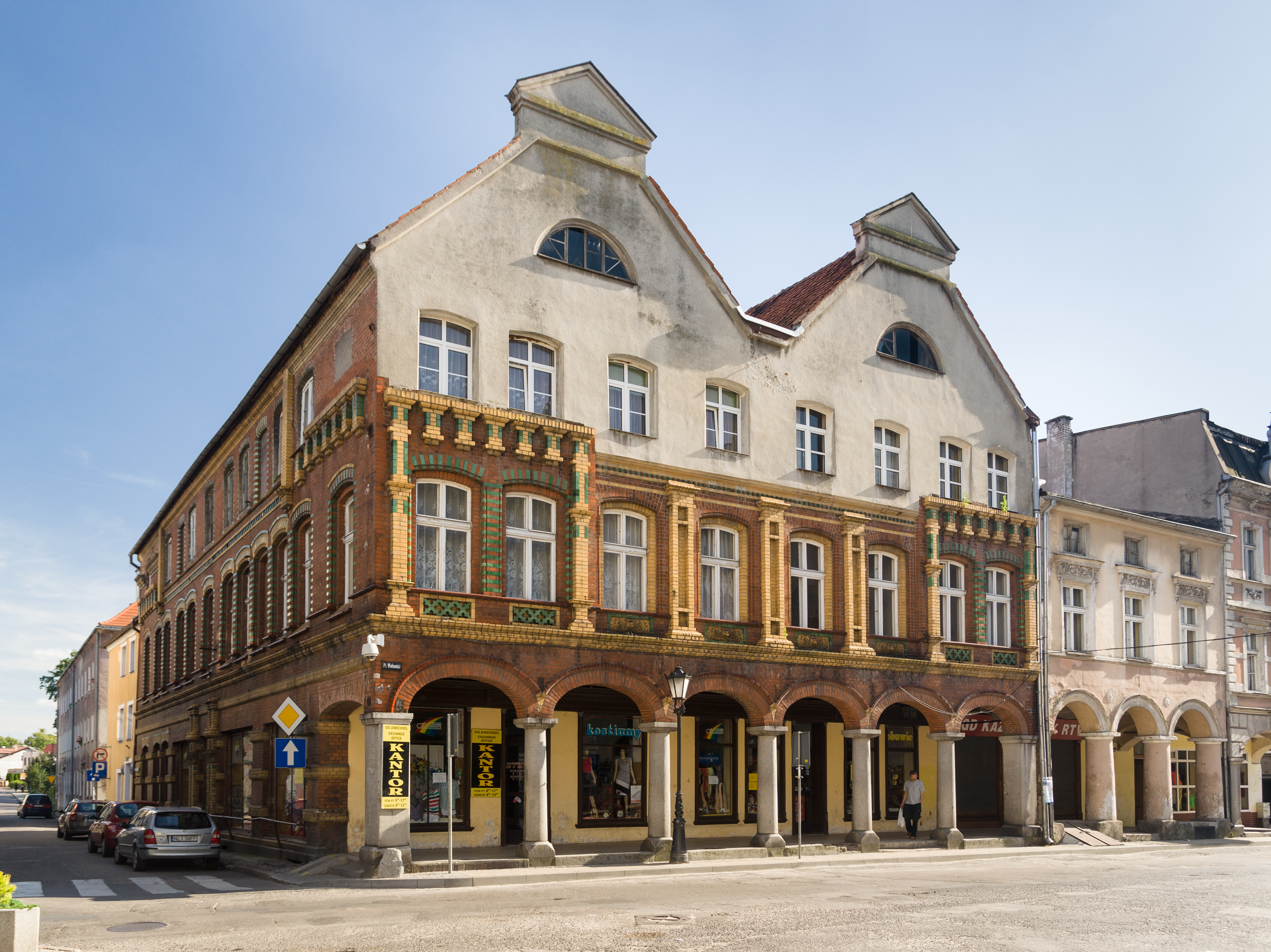
Old townhouses at the Freedom Square (Plac Wolności)

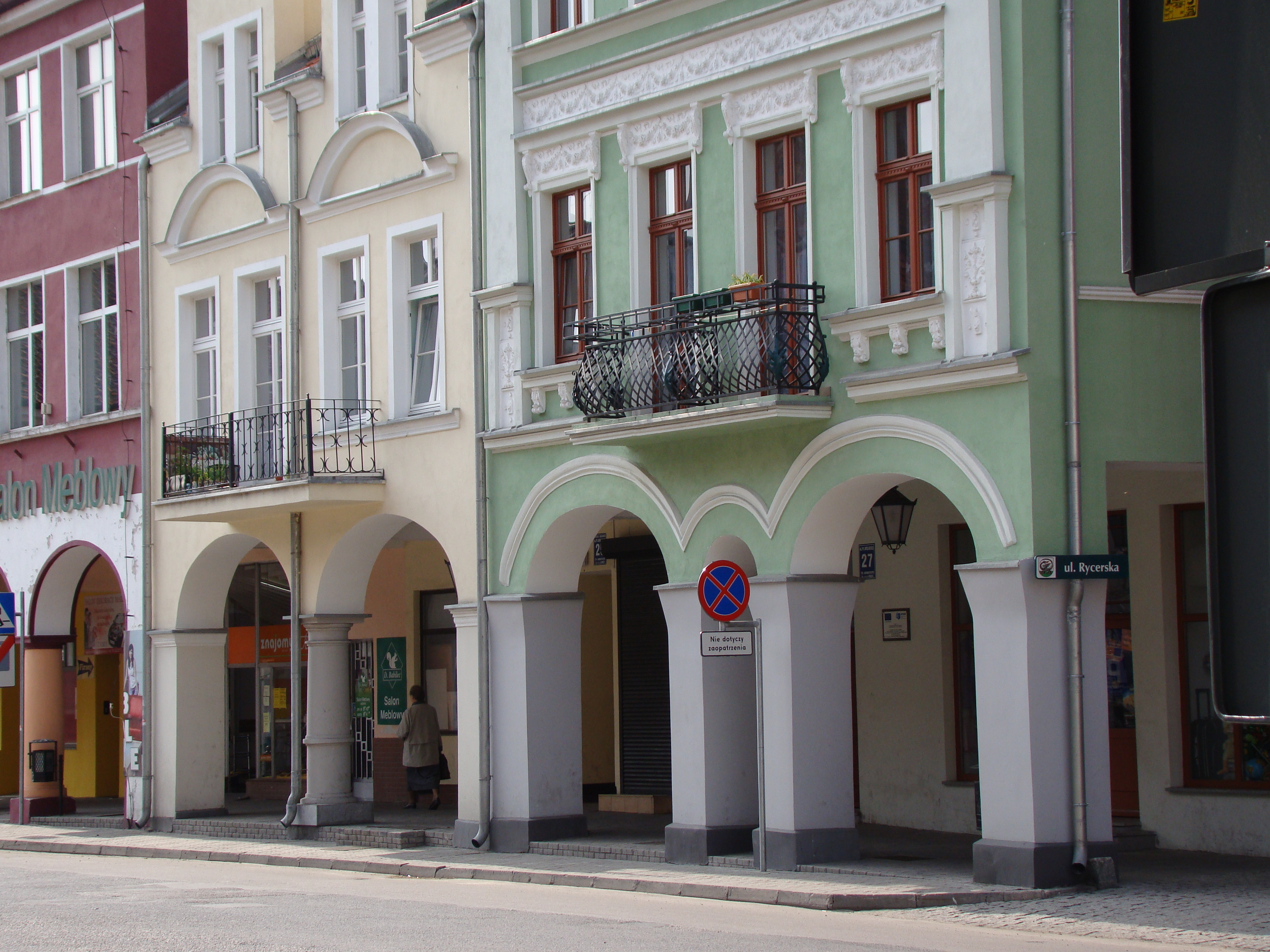
Old townhouses at the Freedom Square

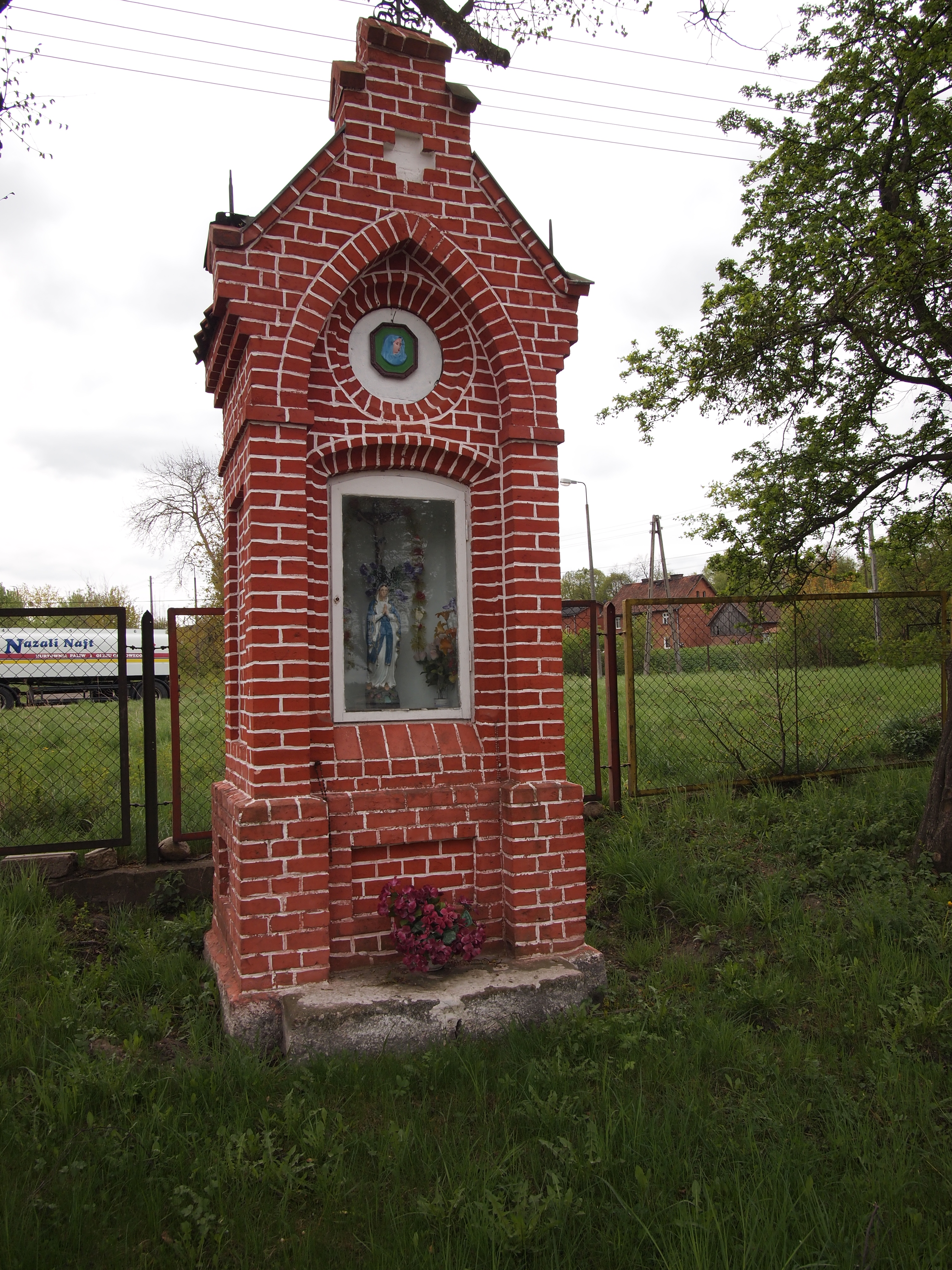
Typical Warmian wayside shrine

== Notable residents ==
- Petrus Zwicker (died 1403), cleric
- Krzysztof Jotko (born 1989), mixed martial artist
