= Bernard de Caux =

- Born: Diocese of Béziers
- Died: 26 November 1252; Agen, Agenais
- Other names: Bernardo or Bernardus de Caucio
- Occupations: Dominican friar Inquisitor
- Years active: 1243–1249
- Known for: Inquisition of heretics
- Notable work: Interrogatoires subis par des hérétiques albigeois par-devant frère Processes inquisitionis (Manual of the Inquisitors of Carcassonne)

Bernard de Caux (birth date not known; (Note: Philippe Lauzun states: le dit né dans le diocèse de Béziers et mort à Agen le 26 novembre, Yves Dossat s'interroge sur la possibilité qu'il soit originaire de l'Agenais et mort à Agen le 27 novembre ["He was born in the Diocese of Béziers and died in Agen on 26 November; Yves Dossat evaluates the possibility of him being a native of Agenais and having died in Agen on 27 November"].) died in Agen on 26 November 1252), or in Latin Bernardo or Bernardus de Caucio, was a Dominican friar and medieval inquisitor. His activities mainly took place in the region of the County of Toulouse between 1243 and 1249. He originated the investigation processes and his witness interrogations are recorded in a 13th-century transcribed manuscript preserved in the library of Toulouse.

== Life and work ==
Bernard de Caux was born in the Diocese of Béziers but the date is not known and became a Dominican friar who was appointed as an inquisitor.

Bernard Gui, an early 14th-century French inquisitor, described de Caux thus: Frater Bernardus de Caucio, inquisitor ac persequtor ac malleus hereticorum (le marteau des hérétiques), vir sanctus et Deo plenus. (Brother Bernard de Caucoi, inquisitor and persecutor and the hammer of heretics, a holy man filled with God.) De Caux was known as the inquisitor of the dioceses of Agen and Cahors, of Carcassonne, and finally Toulouse. His inquisitions were made in conjunction with another Dominican friar, Jean de Saint-Pierre.

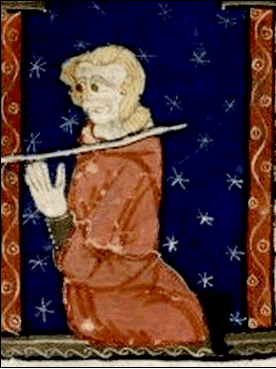
Raymond VII of Toulouse

The Medieval Inquisition in the diocese of Agen was under the control of the tribunal of Toulouse. In 1242 the search and prosecution of the Cathar heretics was given to them by their provincial prior according to the papal bull Ad extirpanda authorised by Pope Gregory IX, who entrusted the Dominicans with the negotium fidei contra haereticos (the business of faith against heretics), in 1233. (Note: In May 1242, Guillaume Arnaud and Étienne de Saint-Thibéry were victims of a massacre at Avignonet.)

The count of Toulouse, Raymond VII, with the support of the bishop of Agen, opposed this appointment, appealing to the pope, on the pretext that the pursuit of heretics was to be done under the direction of the bishop, according to the normal procedure. However, Bernard de Caux and Jean de Saint-Pierre wrote their first acts at Agen in 1243, where they remained until March 1244. They were in Cahors until February 1245, then in Montauban, in Toulouse from May 1245 to July 1246 and again from August 1247 until June 1248. Finally he was in Carcassonne until sometime between June and November 1249 he returned to Agen to be in charge of the foundation of the convent of the Jacobins, as Bernard Gui writes: fuit fundator precipuus et promotor conventus Agennesis (as the distinguished founder and promoter of the Agen convent). The first Dominican friars settled in Agen in November 1249 and the new Count of Toulouse Alphonse de Poitiers took the Agen convent under his protection on 12 June 1251.

A Toulousien house, opposite the abbey of Saint-Sernin, was bought by the bishop of Agen in 1249, given to de Caux to use as a prison in which heretics were imprisoned, awaiting their condemnation. In August 1250 the house was donated to the abbot of Saint-Sernin and the hospital of Saint-Raymond to house poor students, and is now the Musée Saint-Raymond.

De Caux died on 26 (or 27) November 1252 in Agen. His body was later exhumed and buried in the church of the Jacobins of Agen on 26 April 1281 with two other founders of the convent, brother Bertrand de Belcastel and master Arnaud Bélanger. His body was found to be well preserved; it was placed on display so the people of Agen could see what was considered a miracle.

== Interrogations ==
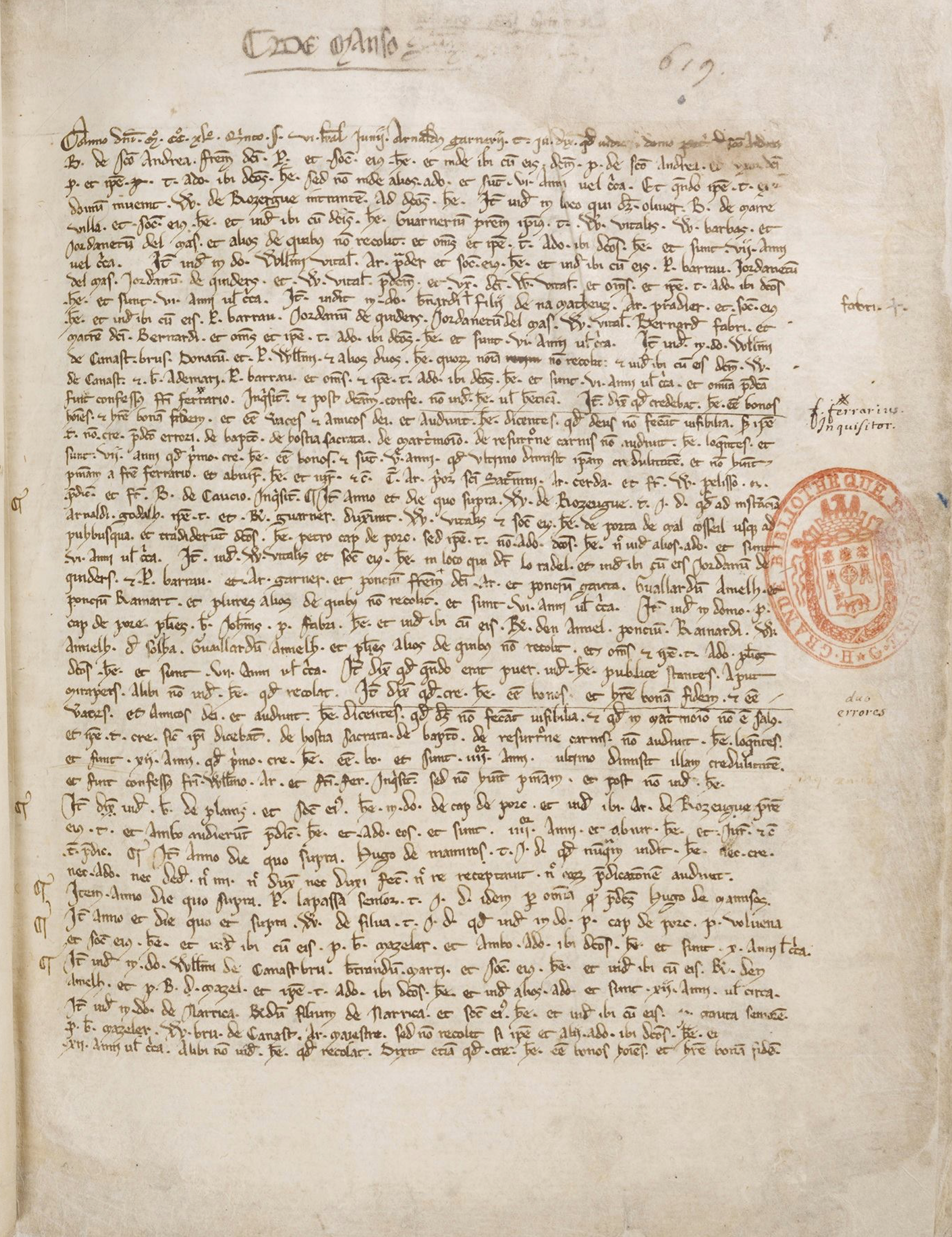
First page of Bernard de Caux witness interrogations - Interrogatoires subis par des hérétiques albigeois par-devant frère

One of the oldest surviving European paper manuscripts, transcribed between 1256 and 1263, are the 5,000 plus witness interrogations and sentences meted out by Bernard de Caux, and held in the Bibliothèque nationale de France and the library of Toulouse. These interrogations are grouped by village or parish as opposed to later records that list by deponents. The inquisitors were keen to record their work and measures were taken to secure them.

Bernard de Caux originated an interrogation procedure described in his Manual of the Inquisitors of Carcassonne or processes inquisitionis (investigation processes), used for half a century before being replaced by the Manual of the Inquisitor of Bernard Gui.

It lists the facts:

- The papal bull Ad extirpanda placed the following constraints on the use of torture:
- *that it did not cause loss of life or limb (''citra membri diminutionem et mortis periculum'')
- *that it was used only once
- *that the Inquisitor deemed the evidence against the accused to be virtually certain.

De Caux and de Saint-Pierre interviewed several thousand people of which 5,065 transcripts of their interrogations were made. Yves Dossat's studies show that life sentences were seldom made.
