= Ad extirpanda =

1252 papal bull authorizing the use of torture

Ad extirpanda Latin for 'To eradicate' Papal bull of Pope Innocent IV
- Signature date: 15 May 1252
- Subject: On the use of torture against heretics

Ad extirpanda ("To eradicate"; named for its Latin incipit) was a papal bull promulgated on Wednesday, May 15, 1252 by Pope Innocent IV which authorized under defined circumstances the use of torture by the Inquisition as a tool for interrogation.

== Context ==
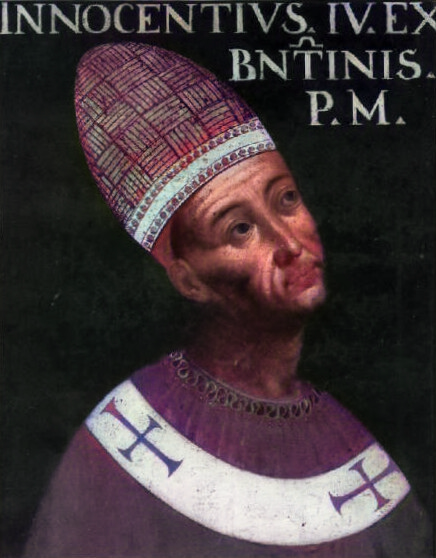
Innocent IV

The bull was issued in the wake of the murder of the papal inquisitor of Lombardy, St. Peter of Verona, who was killed by a conspiracy of Cathar sympathizers on 6 April 1252. It was addressed to the heads of state or rulers, ministers and citizens established in the states and districts of Lombardy, Riviera Romagnola, and Marchia Tarvisina in the Venetia. Judicial torture had become a common practice in the 11th and 12th centuries, following the rediscovery of Roman law. By 1252, it was regarded as an established method by secular tribunals.

== Content ==
The bull argued that as heretics are "murderers of souls as well as robbers of God’s sacraments and of the Christian faith", they are "to be coerced—as are thieves and bandits—into confessing their errors and accusing others, although one must stop short of danger to life or limb." The following parameters were placed on the use of torture by the state:

- that it did not cause loss of life or limb (citra membri diminutionem et mortis periculum)
- that the Inquisitor deemed the evidence against the accused to be virtually certain.

The bull conceded to the State a third portion of the property to be confiscated from convicted heretics, another third to the officials who handled the cases, and another third "deposited in some secure place to be kept by the aforesaid Diocesan bishop and inquisitors, and spent as they shall think fit to promote the faith and extirpate heretics". The State in return assumed the burden of carrying out the penalty. The secular authorities were obliged to do so, under pain of excommunication and interdiction. Some of the measures prescribed were hardly in accordance with any reasonable rule of the law. The houses of the heretics and some of their supporters were to be razed to the ground.

The relevant portion of the bull read: "Those convicted of heresy by the aforesaid Diocesan Bishop, surrogate or inquisitors, shall be taken in shackles to the head of state or ruler or his special representative, instantly, or at least within five days, and the latter shall apply the regulations promulgated against such persons." The 1199 bull Vergentis in senium by Innocent III already declared heresy a crime of lèse-majesté, so deserving the death penalty.
