= Petrus Zwicker =

East Prussian cleric

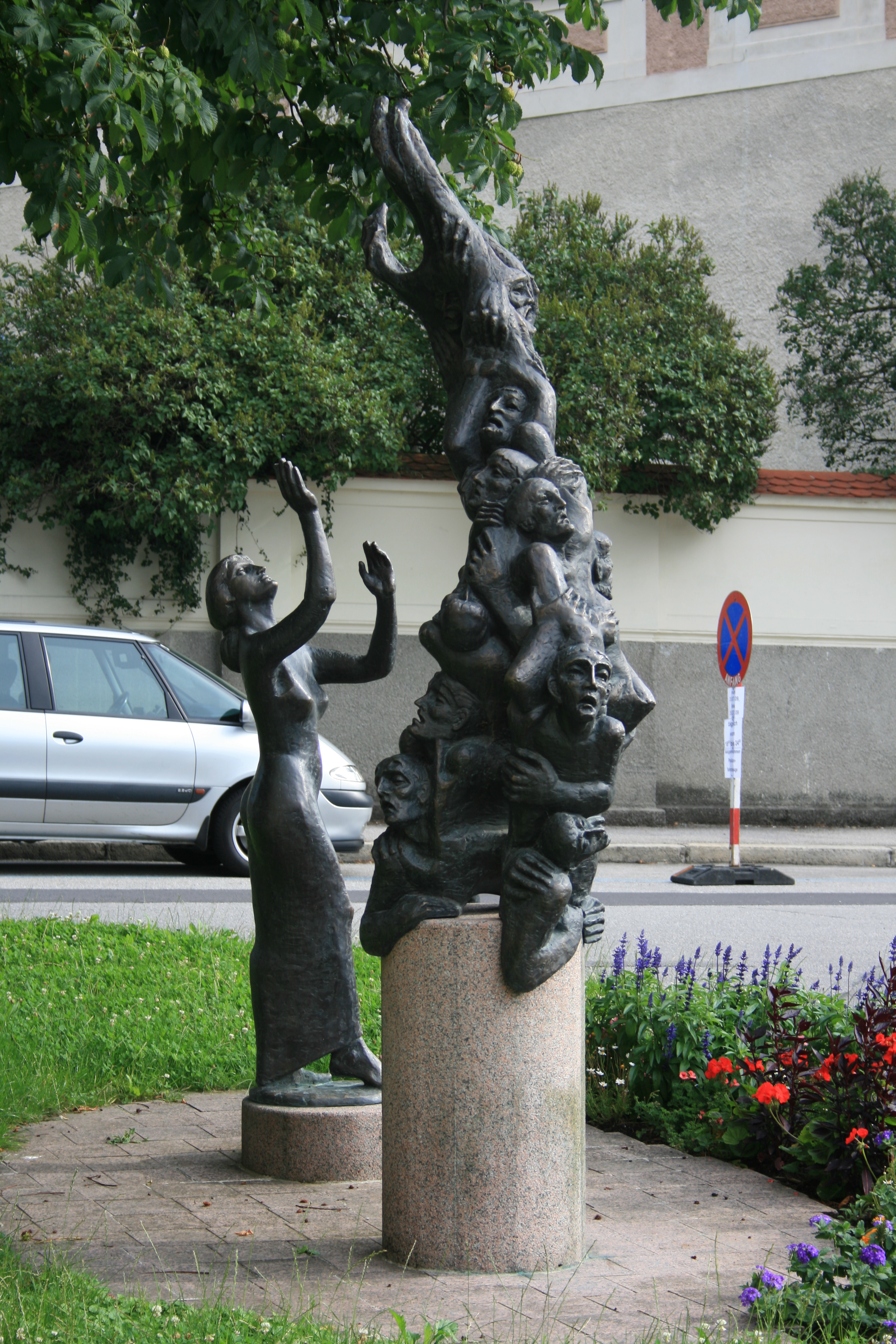
1997 Monument to those burned by Petrus Zwicker in Steyr in 1397

Petrus Zwicker (died 1403) was an East Prussian Inquisitor and cleric of the Roman Catholic Order of the Celestines. Between 1391 and 1403, he led one of the largest inquisitorial operations in the German-speaking world. The victims of this persecution of heretics, in Austria, Pomerania, Brandenburg and Hungary, were almost exclusively Waldensians. The Inquisition records of this period are today only represented by a few fragments.

== Life ==
Petrus Zwicker came from Wormditt in East Prussia and worked in the North Bohemian town of Zittau till 1381 as school principal. In the same year he entered the nearby Celestine monastery at Oybin. By 1395 he was both Prior of the monastery and Provincial superior of the Celestines in Germany. As early as 1390 he was in charge of the persecution of heretics and from 1391 until his death in 1403 in Vienna presided over inquisitorial investigations that often took him on long journeys.

== Bibliography ==
- Herman Haupt: Zwicker, Petrus. In: Allgemeine Deutsche Biographie (ADB). Band 45, Duncker & Humblot, Leipzig 1900, p. 535.
