= Breast ripper =

Torture device

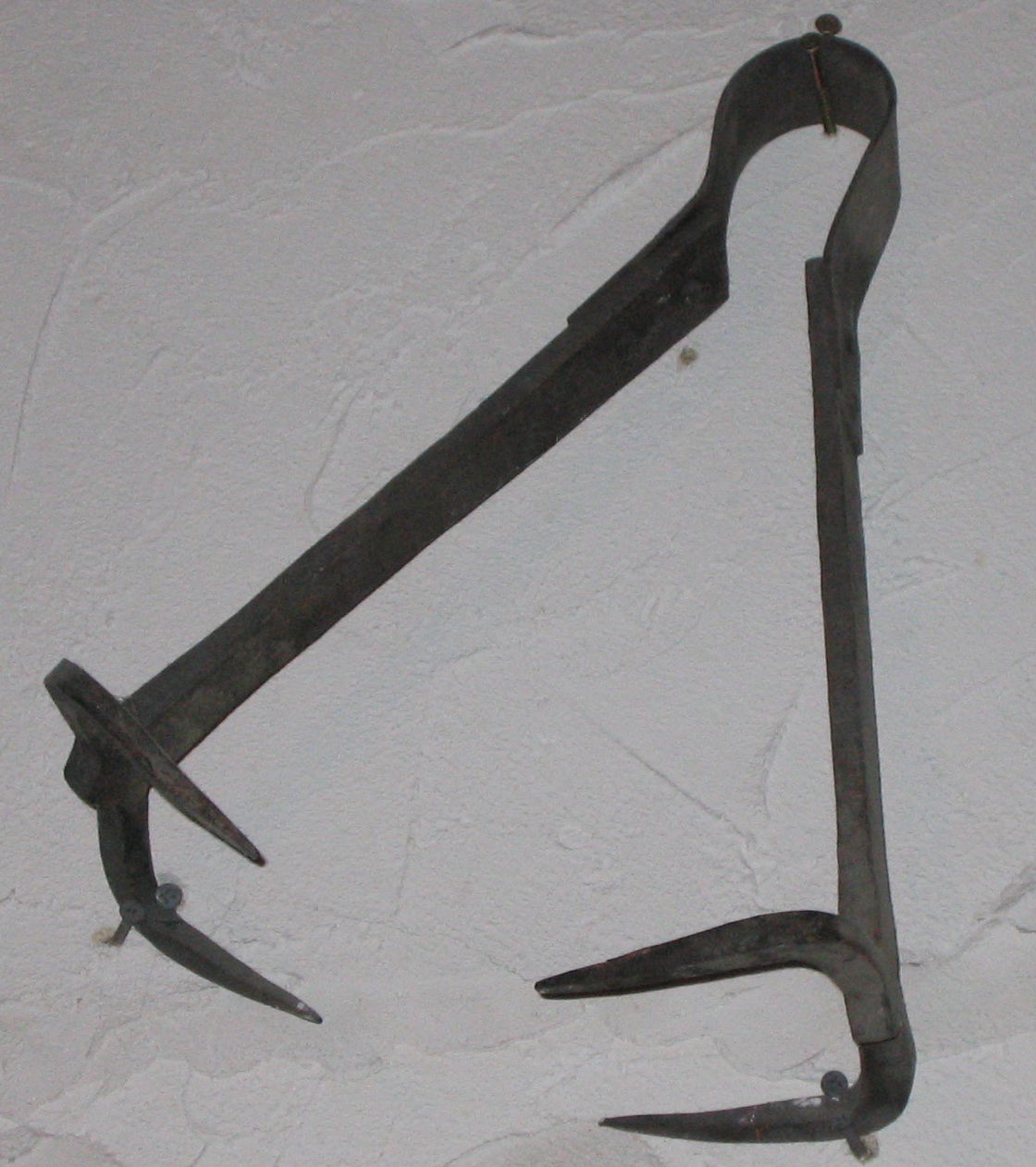
Fifteenth-century breast ripper in a torture museum, Freiburg im Breisgau, Baden-Württemberg, Germany.

The breast ripper, known in another form as the Iron Spider or simply the Spider, was supposedly a torture instrument used on women, usually who were accused of an array of negative attributes decided by inquisitors. The instrument was allegedly designed to rip the breasts from a woman and was made from iron, which was usually heated. It was used in the Middle Ages, but similar concepts were used in ancient Rome. Christian martyrs Agatha of Sicily and Saint Barbara both had their breasts torn off as torture before being killed.

== Description ==
The breast ripper was often heated during torture. It contained four claws, which were used to slowly rip the breasts from women for various crimes. The instrument would be imposed onto a single breast of the woman. They were designed to shred, or tear off the breasts of the victim.

== Spider ==
The Spider, also known as the Iron Spider, was a torture device similar to the breast ripper. The Iron Spider would have been attached to the wall and the woman's breasts were fixed onto the claws of the tool. The woman was then pulled away from the wall, tearing off her breasts. Another variant of this included spiked bars affixed slightly away from the wall. The woman would have been pulled along the bars until her breasts were ripped off.

There is little evidence that such "torture instruments" were used, and the examples exhibited in "Torture Museums" are generally modern artifacts.
