= Jean-Pierre Dedieu =

French historian

Jean-Pierre Dedieu (born 8 August 1948, in Prat-Bonrepaux) is a French historian, specialist of the history of Spain.

== Short biography ==
He is known especially for his studies about the Spanish Inquisition. He has been director of the Maison des Pays Ibériques in Bordeaux and member of the scientific board of the Casa de Velázquez in Madrid. More recently he has studied the political system of the Spanish monarchy in the 18th and 19th centuries. Because of an interest in the application of informatics to historical research since the late 1980s, he has developed the "Fichoz" database system. Since January 2005, he is "directeur de recherches" at the LARHRA - CNRS UMR 5190 in Lyon. Within the LARHRA he has founded and directed the Pôle "Méthodes" initiative.

== Selected bibliography ==
- "Les causes de la foi de l'Inquisition de Tolède (1483-1820): Essai statistique", Melanges de la Casa de Velázquez, ISSN 0076-230X, Nº 14, 1978, p. 143-172
- (with J. Contreras) "Geografía de la Inquisición Española: la formación de los distritos (1470-1820)", Hispania: Revista española de historia, Vol. 40, Nº 144, 1980, p. 37-94
- "Les quatre temps de l'Inquisition", "Le modèle religieux: les disciplines du langage et de l'action", "Le modèle religieux: le refus de la Réforme", "Le modèle sexuel: la défense du mariage chrétien", in: B. Bennassar, dir., L'Inquisition espagnole, XVe-XIXe siècle, Paris, Hachette, 1979, p. 15-42 et 241-339.
- L'Inquisition, Cerf, Paris, 1987, 128 p.
- L'administration de la foi. L'Inquisition de Tolède et les vieux-chrétiens (XVIe-XVIIe siècle), Casa de Velázquez, Madrid, 1989, 406 p.
- L'Espagne de 1492 à 1808, Belin, Paris, 1994, 286 p. (2ème édition révisée 2005).
- Les mots de l'Inquisition, PUM, Toulouse, 2002, 123 p.
- (with R. Millar Carvacho) "Entre histoire et mémoire. L'Inquisition à l'époque moderne: dix ans d'historiographie" in: Annales. Histoire, Sciences sociales, 57, 2002, p. 349-372
- L'inquisition et le peuple en Espagne in A. Borromeo (ed.), L'inquisizione. Atti del Simposio Internazionale, Città del Vaticano, 29-31 ottobre 1998, Biblioteca Apostolica Vaticana, Città del Vaticano, 2003, p. 193-216
- Après le roi. Essai sur l'effondrement de la Monarchie espagnole, Casa de Velázquez, Madrid, 2010, 210 p.
- Entries "Abilitazioni; Archivi (Spagna); Conversos (Spagna), Daimiel (moriscos di); Fiandre; Galizia; Inquisitori di distretto; Madrid; Murcia; Osma; Stranieri (Spagna); Toledo" in V. Lavenia, A. Prosperi, J. Tedeschi (a cura di), Dizionario storico dell'Inquisizione, Edizioni della Scuola Normale Superiore, Pisa 2010
- "The Spanish inquisition. Current research in perspective" in A dieci anni dall'apertura dell'Archivio della Congregazione per la Dottrina della Fede: storia e archivi dell'Inquisizione, Roma, 21-23 febbraio 2008 (Atti dei Convegni Lincei, 260), Scienze e Lettere Editore Commerciale, Rome 2011, p. 51-69
- (with S. Marzagalli, P. Pourchasse, W. Scheltens) "Navigocorpus: A Database for Shipping Information - A Methodological and Technical Introduction", International Journal of Maritime History XXIII, 2, 2011, p. 241-262
- (with C. Courrier) "Ecrire à Pompéi: propositions pour une modernisation du CIL IV", Sylloge Epigraphica Barcinonensis (SEBarc), X, 2012, p. 371-388

== See also ==
- Casa de Velázquez
- Spanish Inquisition
