= Godkin =

Godkin is a surname. Notable people with the surname include:

- Edwin Lawrence Godkin (1831–1902), American journalist and newspaper editor
- George Godkin (1860–1919), Canadian jeweller, watchmaker and political figure in Prince Edward Island
- James Godkin (1806–1879), Irish author and journalist who was influential on ecclesiastical and land questions
- John Godkin Giles (1834–1903), Canadian medical doctor and political figure in Ontario

== See also ==
- Godkin Lectures, annual lecture hosted by Harvard University's John F. Kennedy School of Government
- Godaikin
- Godki
- Goodkind (disambiguation)
