= Gamerki =

Gamerki may refer to the following places in Poland:

- Gamerki Małe
- Gamerki Wielkie
