= Battle of Allenstein =

1807 battle during the War of the Fourth Coalition

- Part of the War of the Fourth Coalition
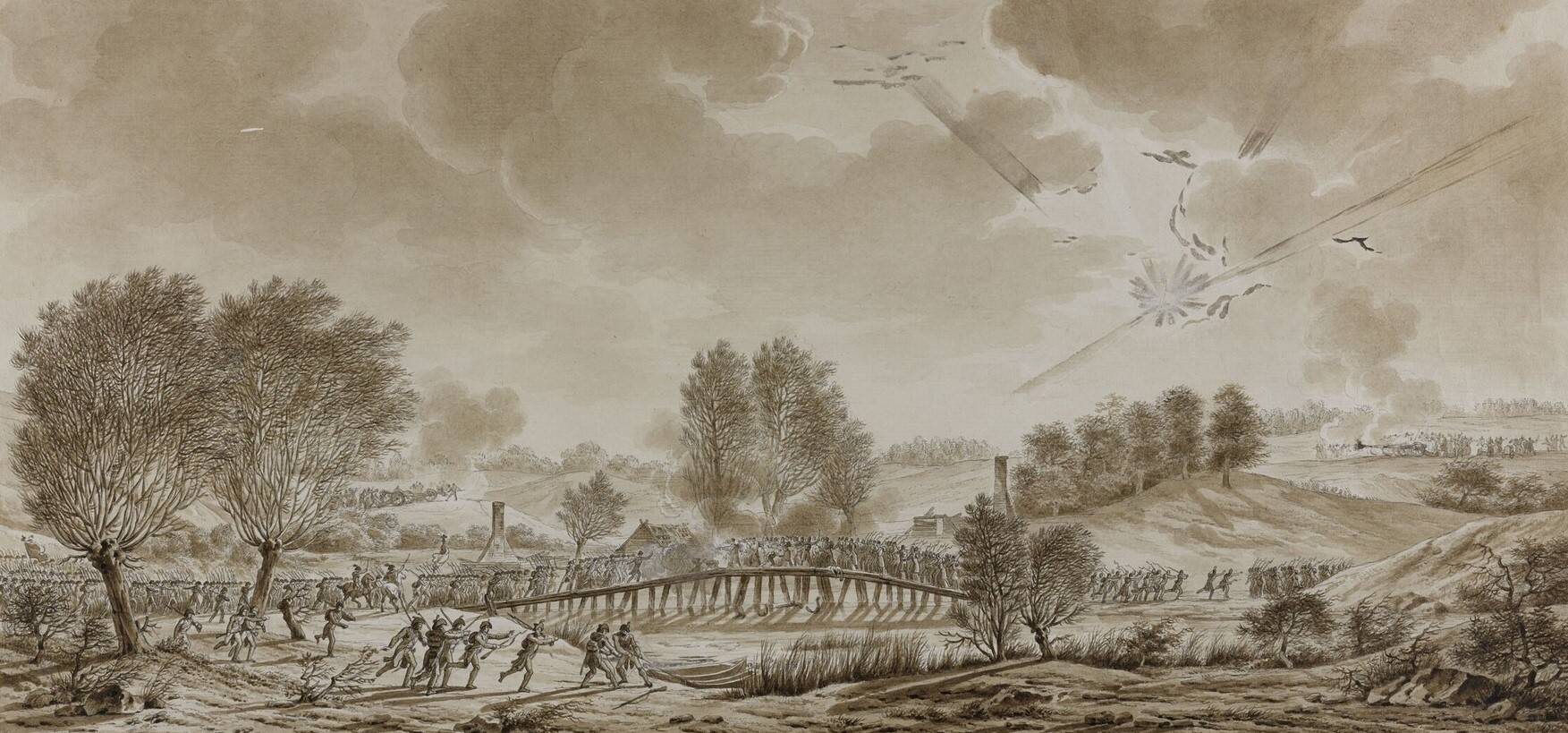
- Infantry combat between French troops and Russian troops on the Bergfriede bridge, 3 February 1807 at 3 in the afternoon by Constant Bourgeois, 1807
Date	3 February 1807
Location	Allenstein, Kingdom of Prussia 53°46′40″N 20°28′45″E
Result	French victory

Belligerents
(France) French Empire	(Russia) Russian Empire

Commanders and leaders
(France) Napoleon Bonaparte (France) Joachim Murat (France) Jean-de-Dieu Soult	(Russia) Levin Bennigsen (Russia) Nikolay Kamensky

Strength
IV Corps; Milhaud's dragoon div.	Kamensky's division

Casualties and losses
Unknown	800 dead and wounded 300 captured 6 cannons captured

War of the Fourth Coalition
⬤ current battle
⬤ Napoleon not in command
⬤ Napoleon in command

The Battle of Allenstein (or Olsztyn), also known as the Battle of Jonkowo (or Jankowo, Inkowo, Jonkendorf) and the Battle of Bergfriede, was a military engagement during the early stages of the 1807 Fourth Coalition Napoleonic campaign. While the battle resulted in a French field victory and allowed for a successful pursuit of the Russian army, it failed to produce the decisive engagement that Napoleon was seeking.

== Context ==
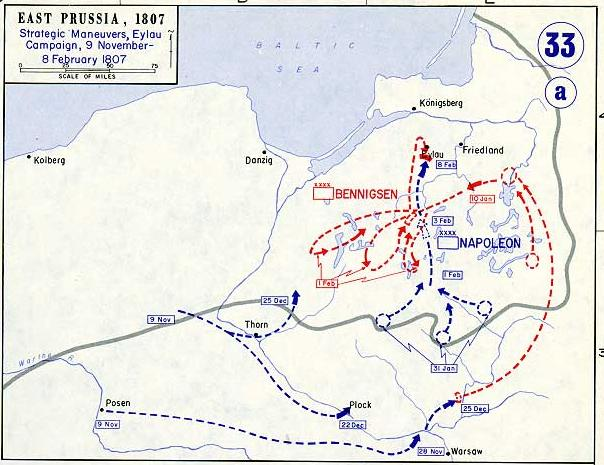
The Eylau campaign map.

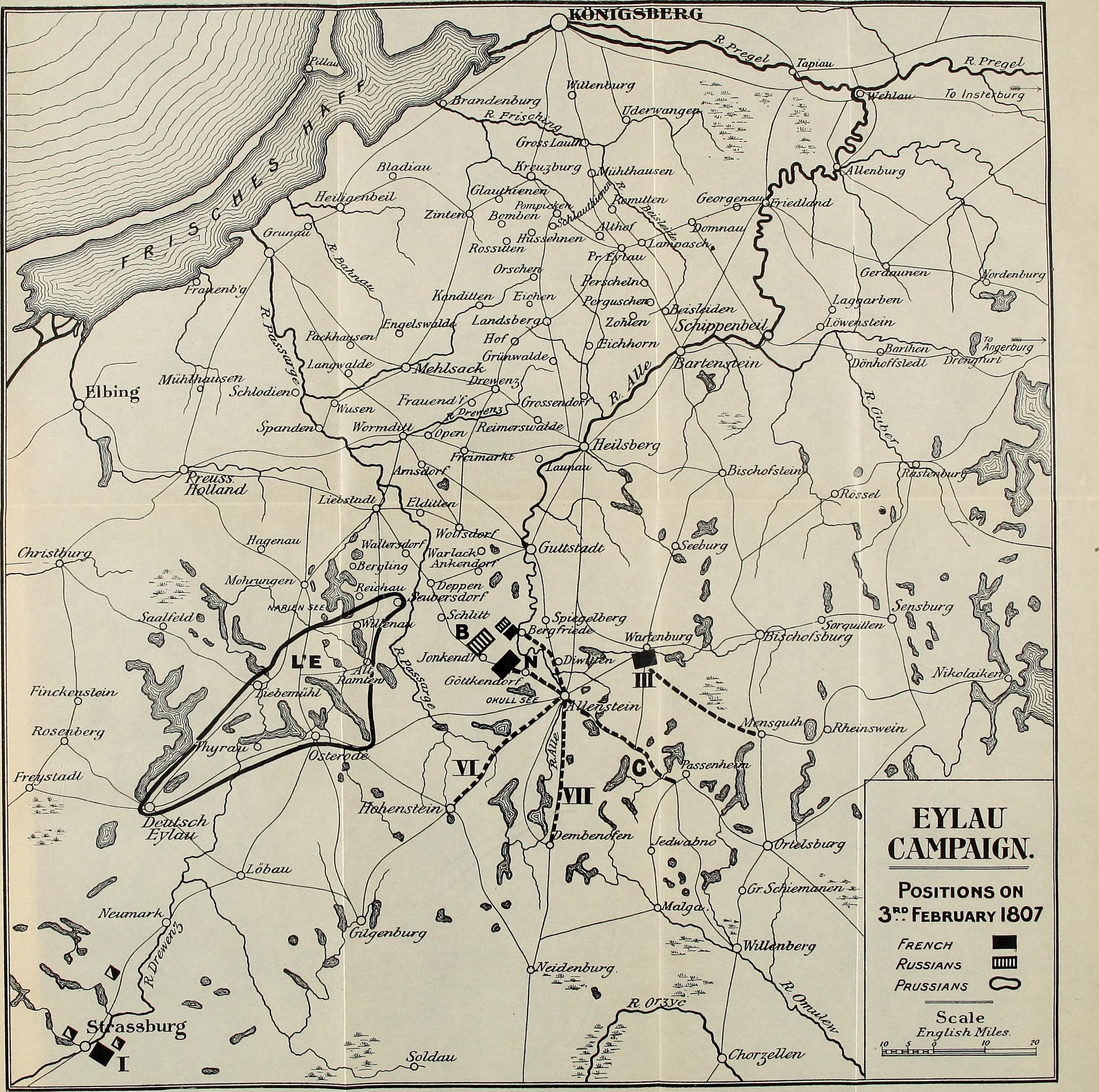
The Eylau campaign. Positions on 3 February 1807.

After crushing the Prussian forces in 1806, Napoleon and his Grande Armée advanced east into the eastern provinces of Prussia, with the aim of bringing the Russian there army to give decisive battle. However, the arrival of winter led the Emperor to order his army to winter quarters, thinking that the Russians will do the same. In order to exploit this misapprehension, the Russian commander Levin August von Bennigsen decided to take the initiative and, towards the end of January set his troops in motion to attack the weak French left, crush it and fall behind the French army.

Quite fortuitously, the French of Michel Ney's Corps, who had disobeyed orders and overextended his foraging array, encountered the Russian advance guard. Thus Napoleon was able to read into Bennigsen's intentions and set up what was supposed to be the decisive manoeuvre of the campaign. Ordering his left wing to fall back in order to pull in the Russian army westwards, the Emperor directed the bulk of his forces northwards, towards Allenstein, in a bid to outflank the unsuspecting enemy and fall behind it with superior forces.

The Russians intercepted a crucial dispatch, in which the Chief of Staff, Louis Alexandre Berthier, was explaining the entire plan to the commander of the left wing corps, Jean-Baptiste Bernadotte. This allowed Bennigsen to realize the mortal danger in which his army lay and begin a precipitated retreat northeast.

== Battle ==
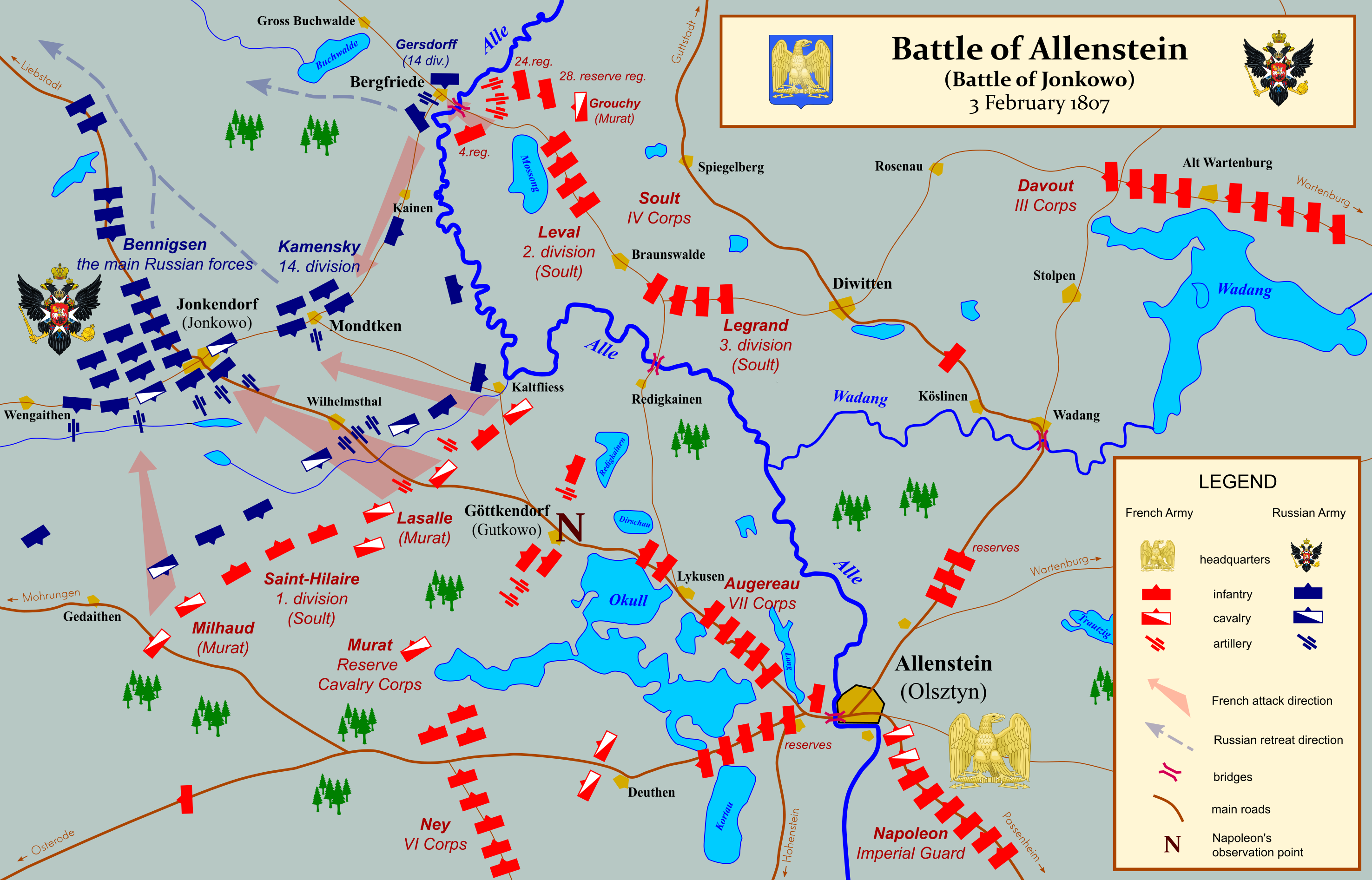
Battle of Allenstein or Jonkowo

Meanwhile, oblivious of the Russian retreat, the French pursued their intended manoeuvre, pushing their advance guard, elements of the Reserve Cavalry Corps of Joachim Murat, supported by Jean-de-Dieu Soult's Corps, towards the Alle river.

On February 3, these troops arrived at Allenstein and the Inkowo plateau, where they discovered a portion of the retreating Russian army. Napoleon himself arrived that morning, and seeing an opportunity for a major battle, ordered four more army corps to march to the battlefield. He detailed Murat to delay his attack in order to wait for reinforcements and, as soon as these reached the battlefield, attack the Russians frontally using Louis-Vincent-Joseph Le Blond de Saint-Hilaire's division, while Soult would march to flank the enemy.

On the Russian side, General Nikolay Kamensky was forced to accept battle rather than retreat, in order to protect the strategic Liebstadt road and the bridges over the Alle in Bergfriede, which were key for the successful retreat of the rest of the army. He was helped in his task by the fact the French only attacked towards 15:00 hours, a delay caused by Napoleon's orders to Murat. When the French eventually attacked, the Russians were prepared and used their fifteen cannon and musketry to inflict heavy losses to the advancing enemy. Nevertheless, the Russian tactical disposition, defending a defilé rather than occupying high ground, soon forced them to give ground under the pressure.

Towards the end of the afternoon, Soult, with the 24th Light and 4th Line regiments began his flanking attack and, after some ferocious combat, pushed the Russians beyond the Alle, capturing an intact Bergfriede bridge. With night falling and his position completely compromised, Bennigsen decided to hasten his retreat and ordered Kamensky to extricate his force and withdraw to Deppen. Both sides suffered relatively high losses, with the Russians forced to abandon six cannon and three hundred prisoners on the field of battle.

== Result ==
Despite this tactical success, Napoleon failed to bring the Russians to give decisive battle, requiring a further exhausting wintertime pursuit. Nevertheless, the French did capture the intact strategic bridges over the Alle, which the Russians omitted to blow up.

French pursuit resumed the next day, resulting in the capture of sixteen cannon, while the day after Soult captured no less than 1200 prisoners. A series of skirmishes led to the Battle of Hoff on February 6, followed by the Battle of Eylau, one of the bloodiest engagements of the entire Napoleonic Wars.

== Gallery ==
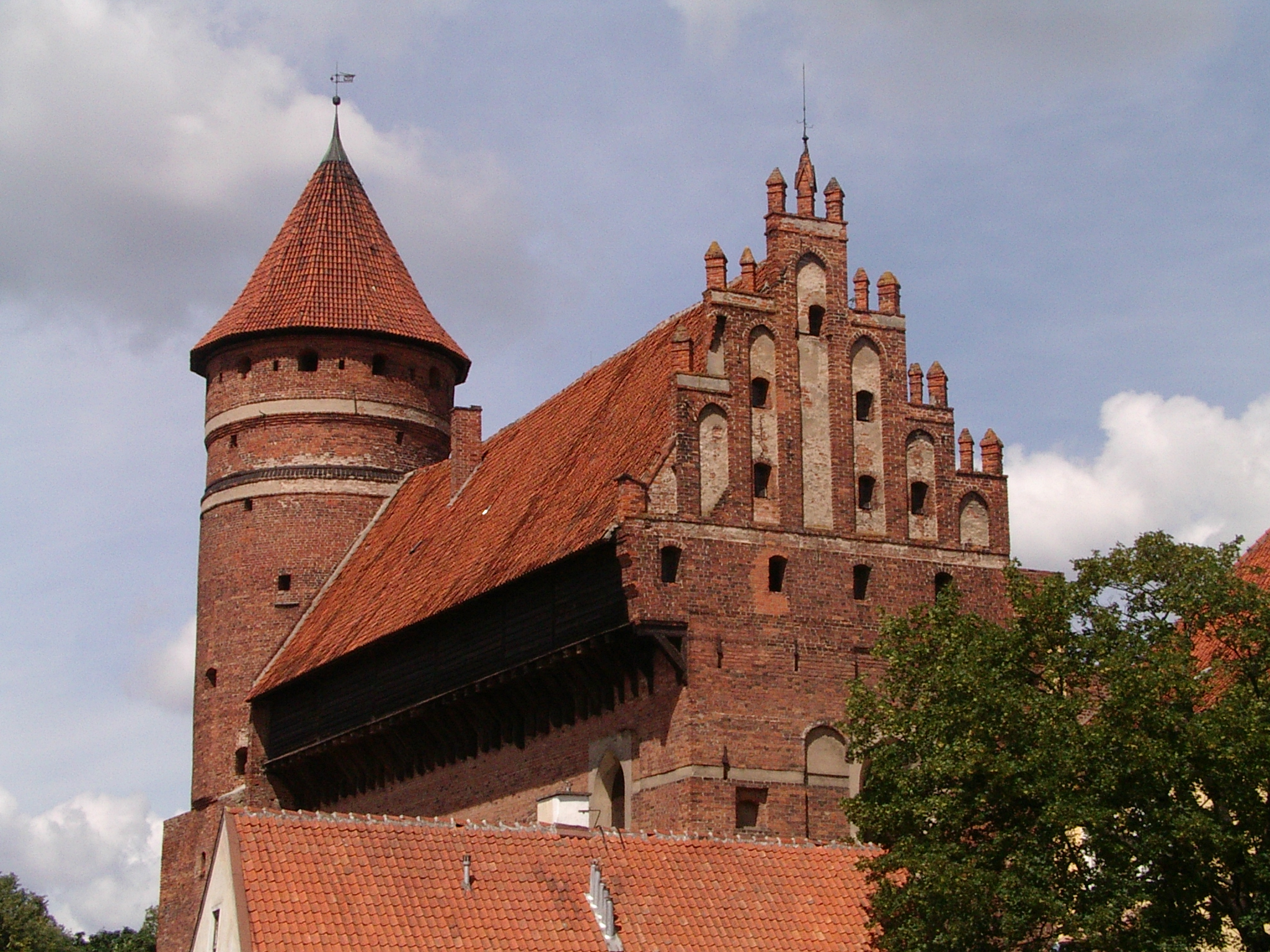
The medieval Olsztyn Castle, the headquarters of the French command in 1807. Napoleon visited the Castle on February 3

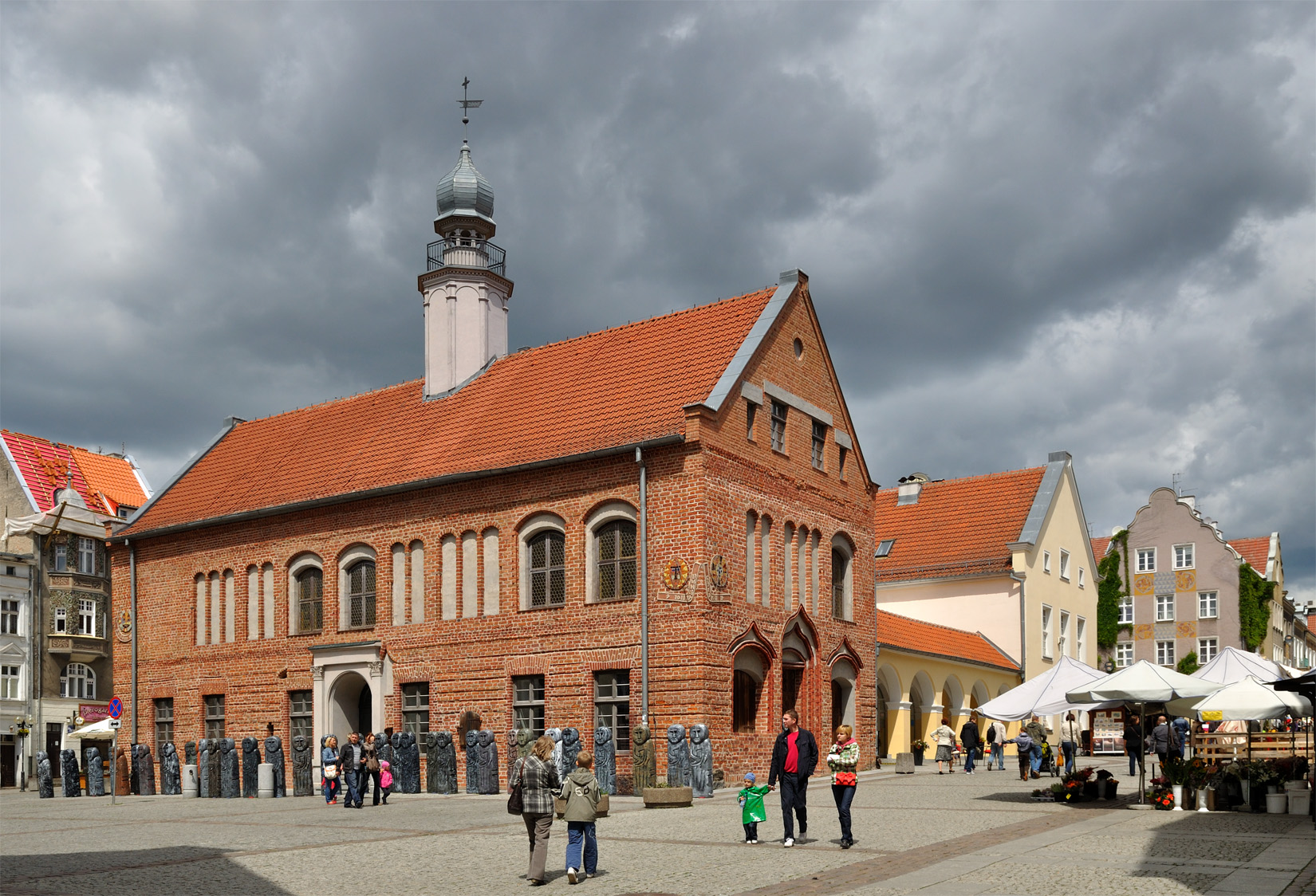
The Market Square in Olsztyn, place of receipt of reports by Napoleon

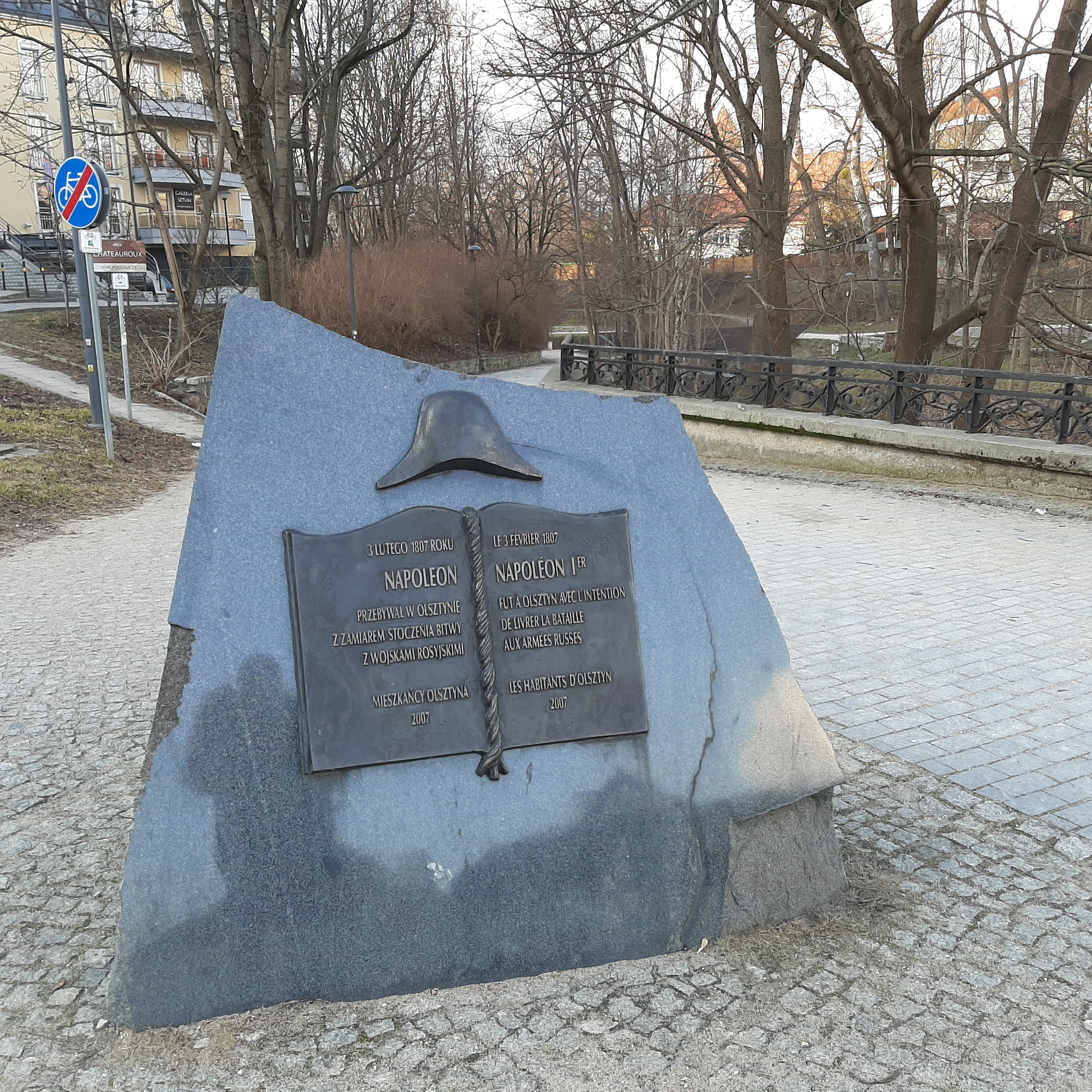
Napoleon's Stone in Olsztyn, next to Łyna (Alle) river, with a bilingual Polish and French inscription

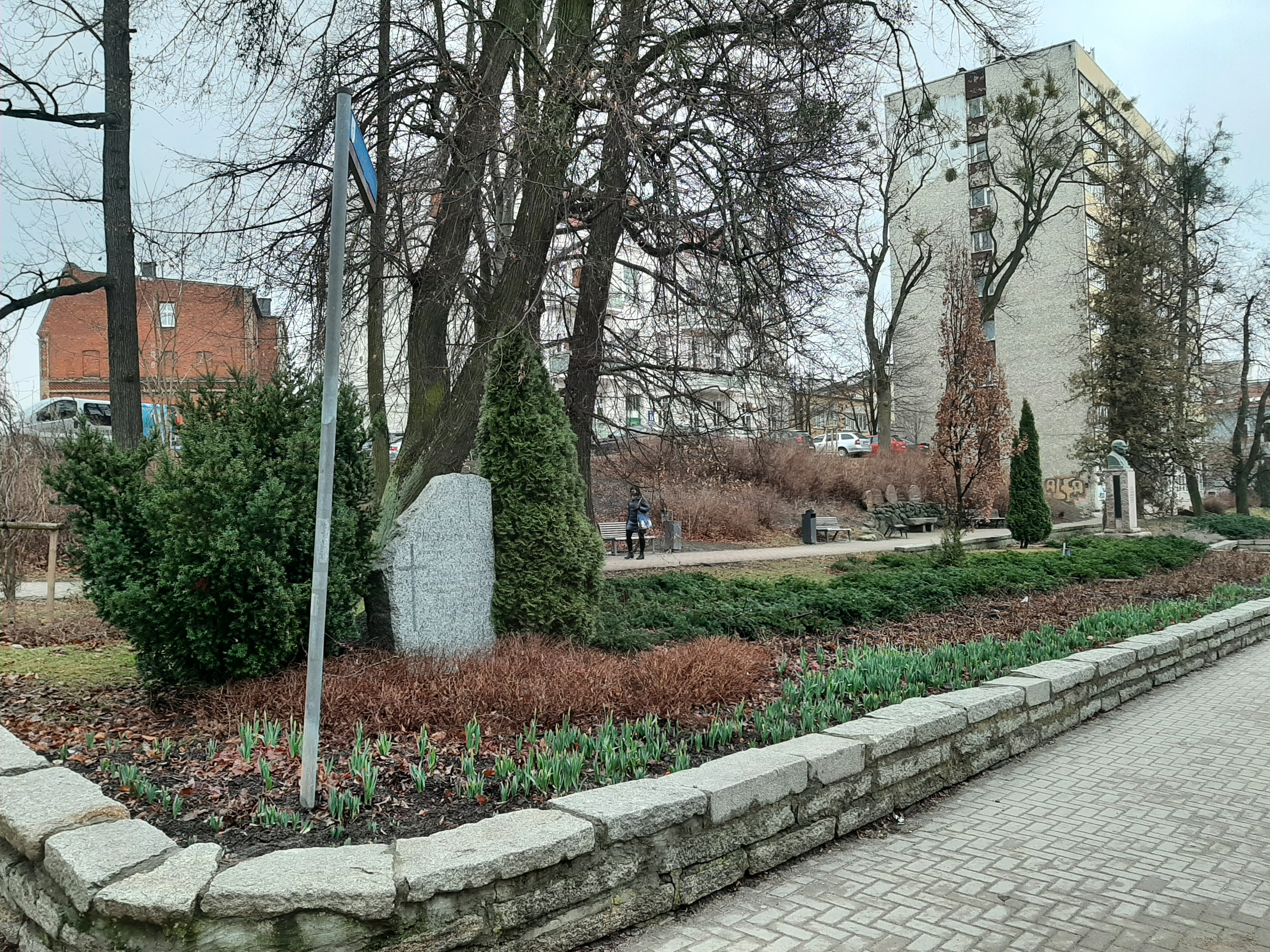
Three Crosses Square in Olsztyn, place of burial of French and Russian soldiers who died in 1807

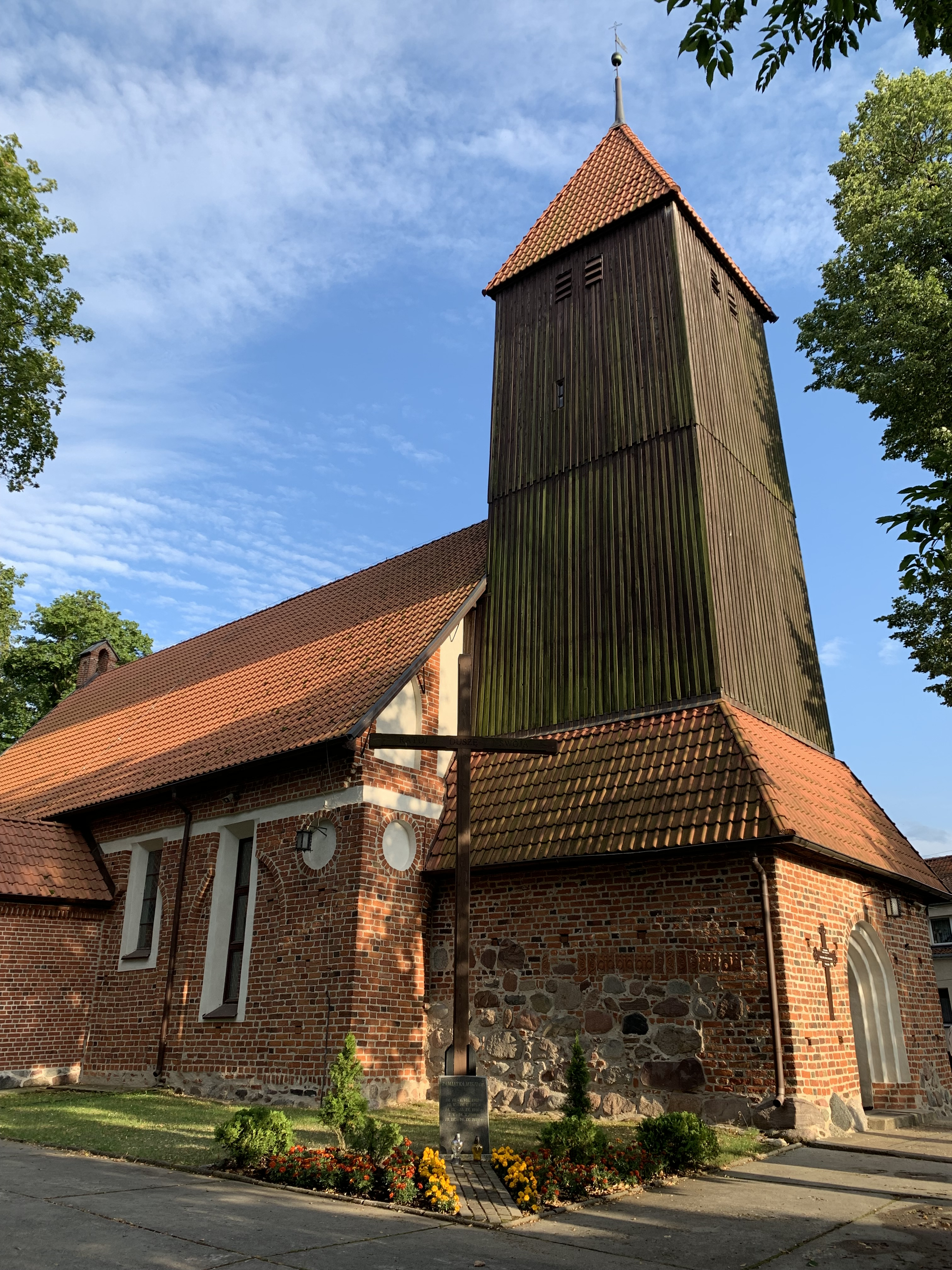
The historic wooden church tower in Gutkowo (now part of Olsztyn), Napoleon's observation point

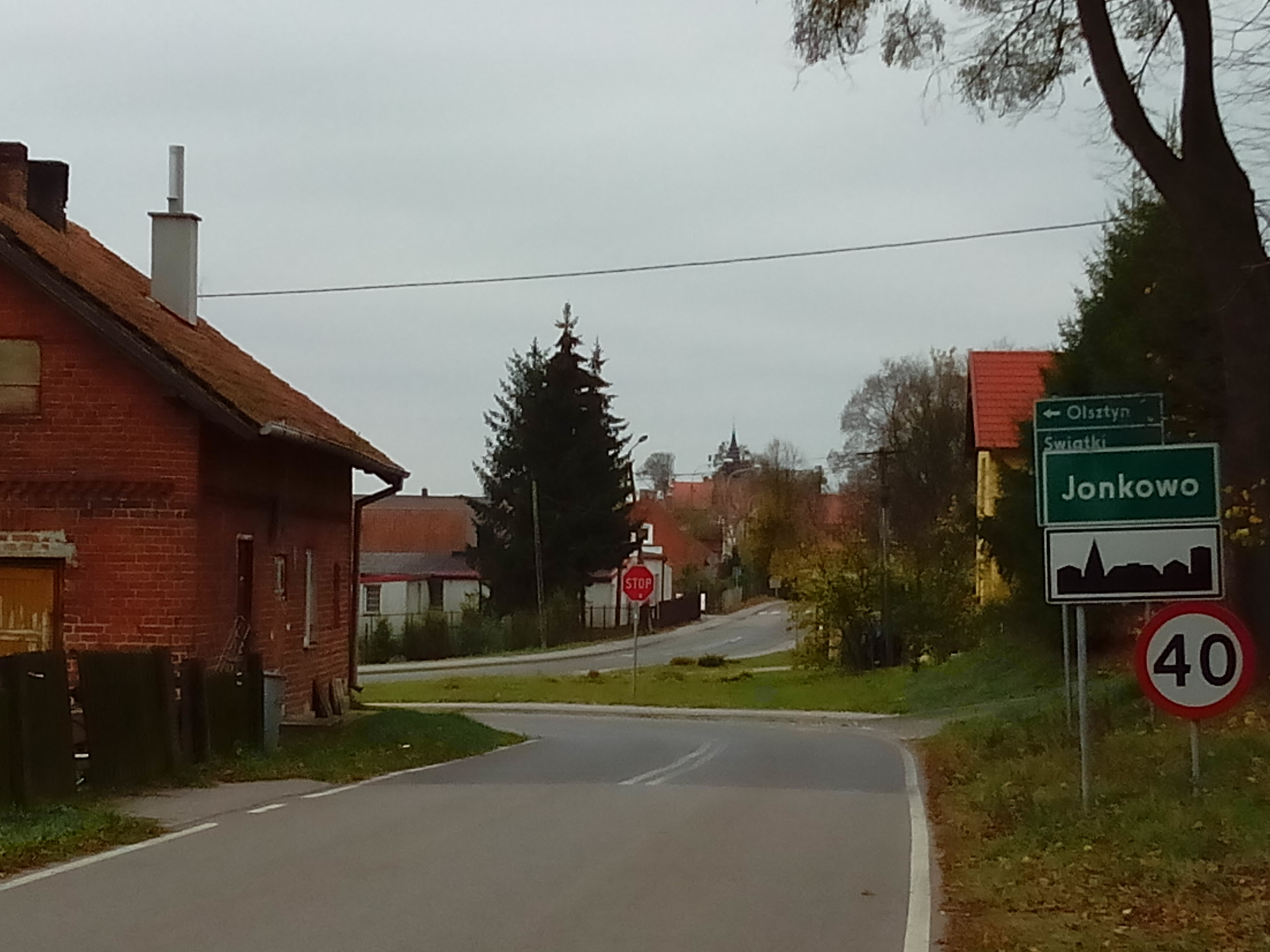
Jonkowo, the location of the Russian Army, present view

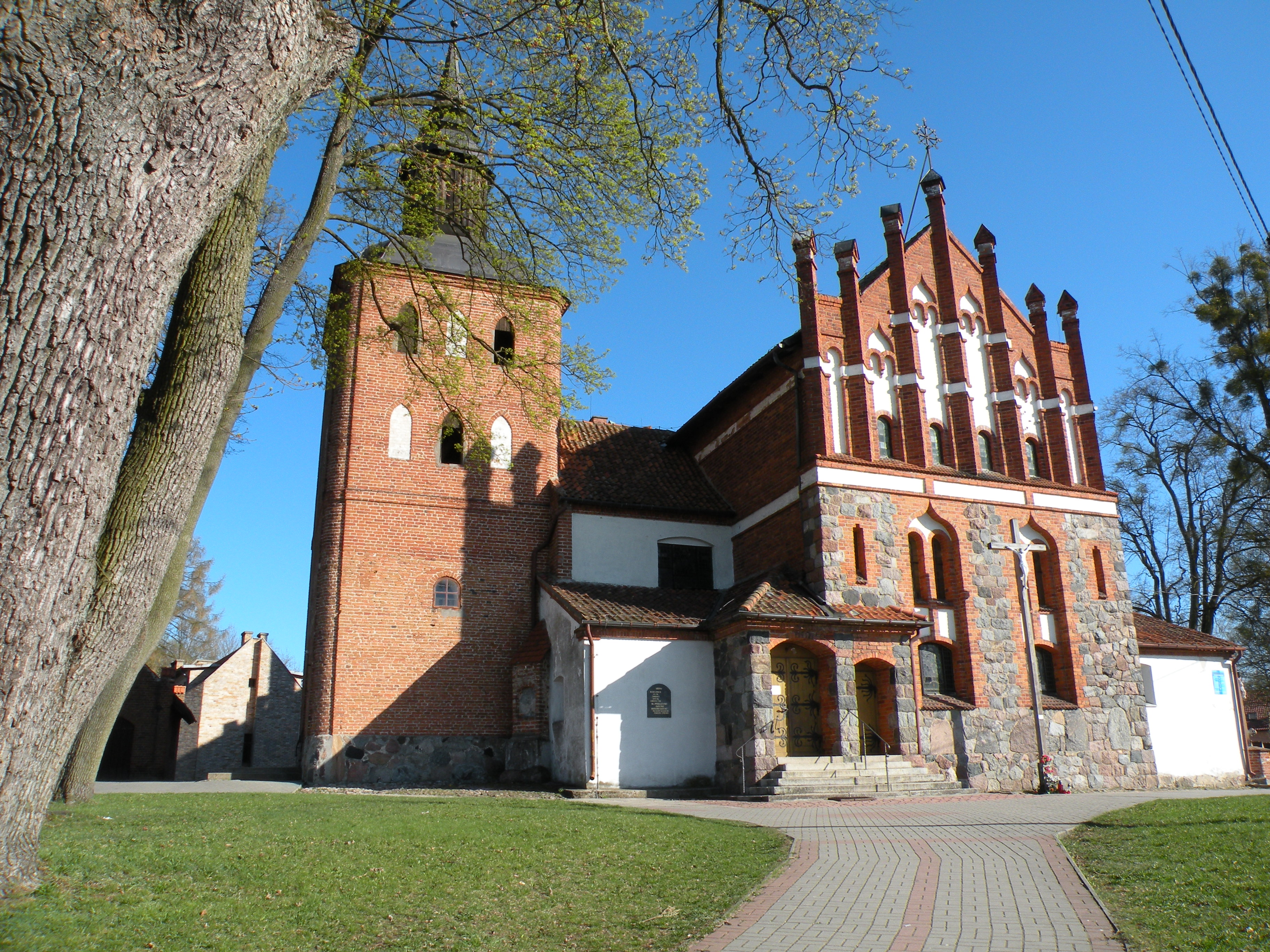
Historic church in Jonkowo. Napoleon visited the parsonage in Jonkowo the day after the battle

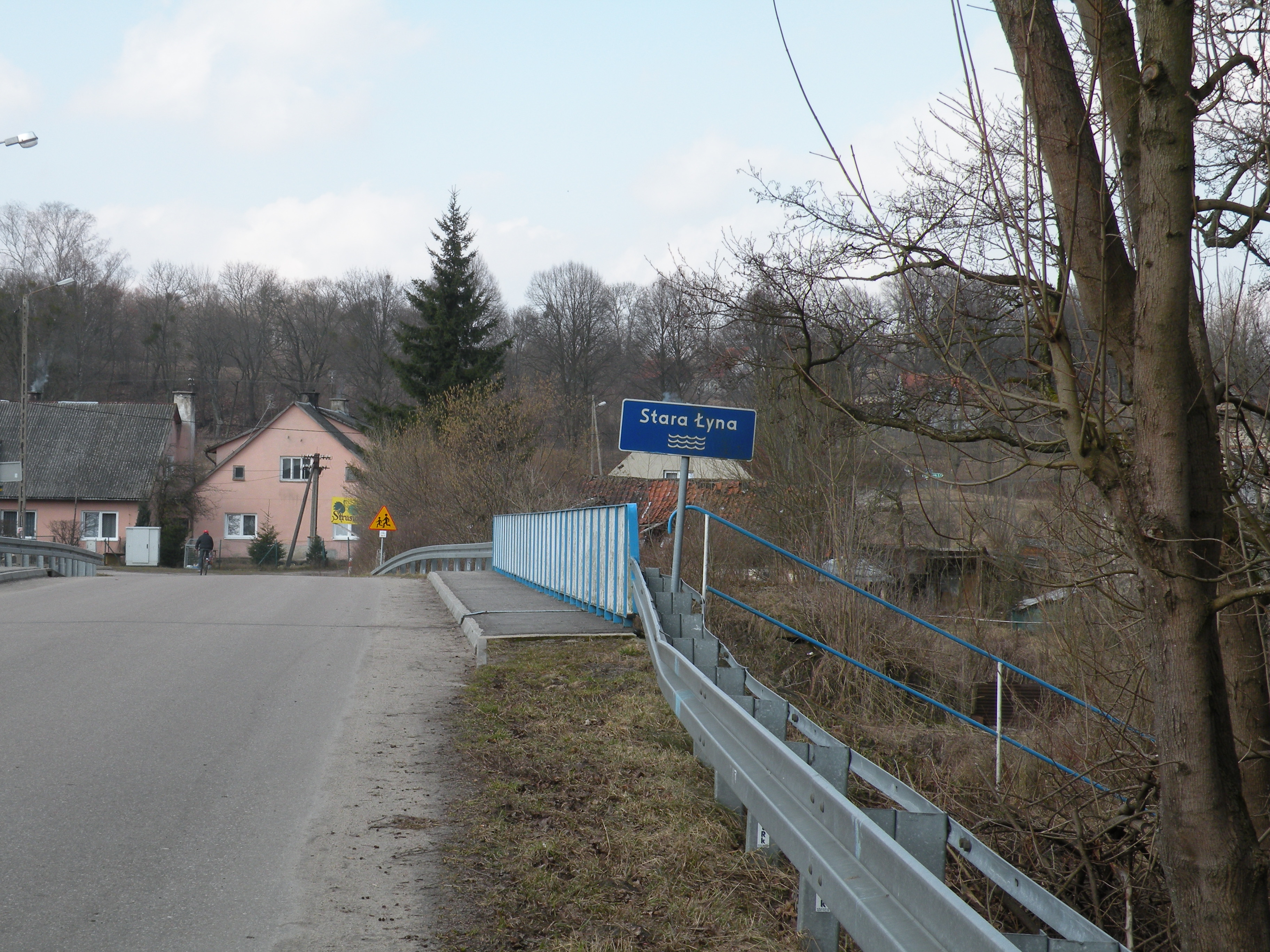
The new bridge in Barkweda (Bergfriede), the place of fierce fighting

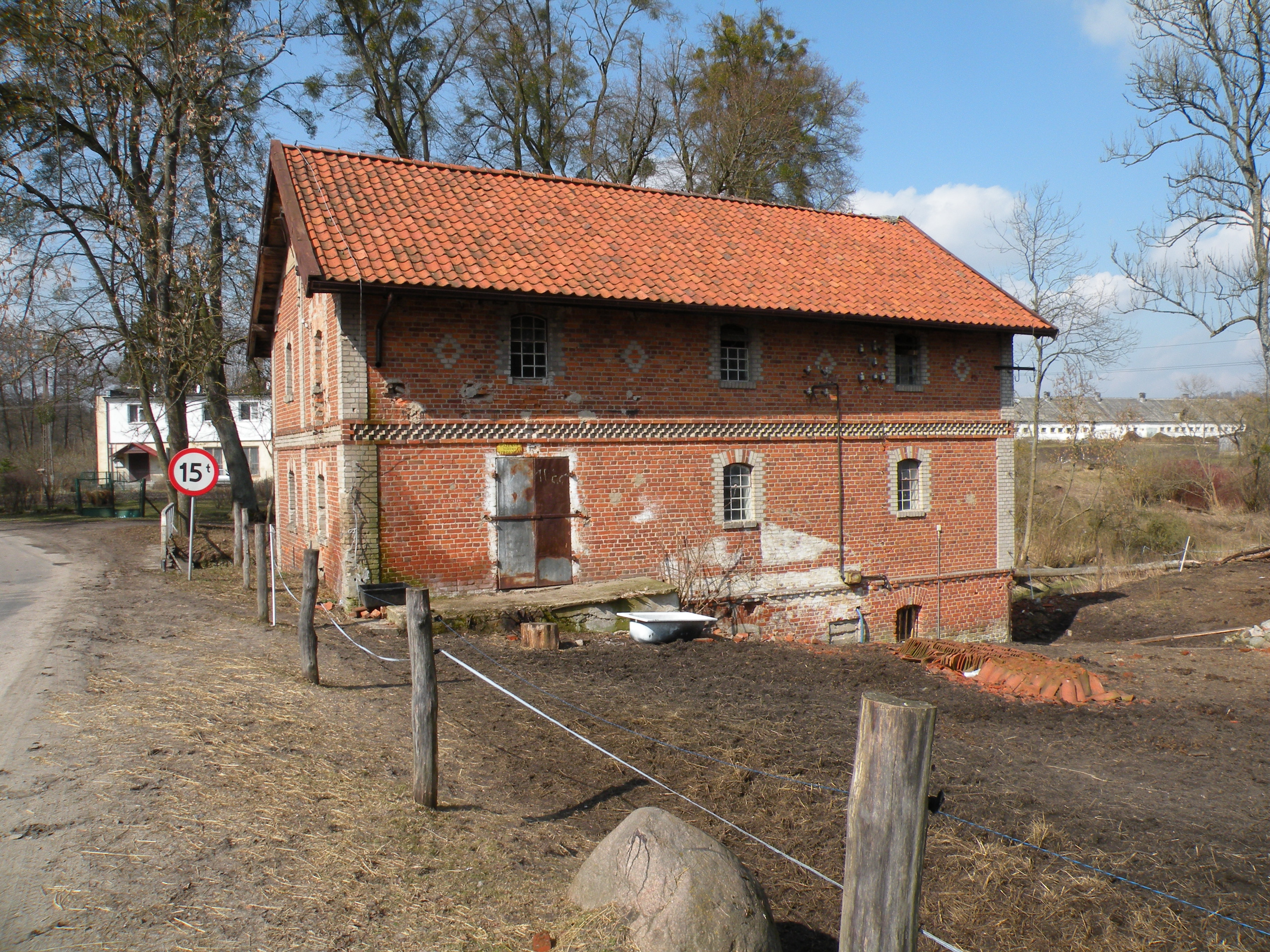
Water mill in Barkweda, present view

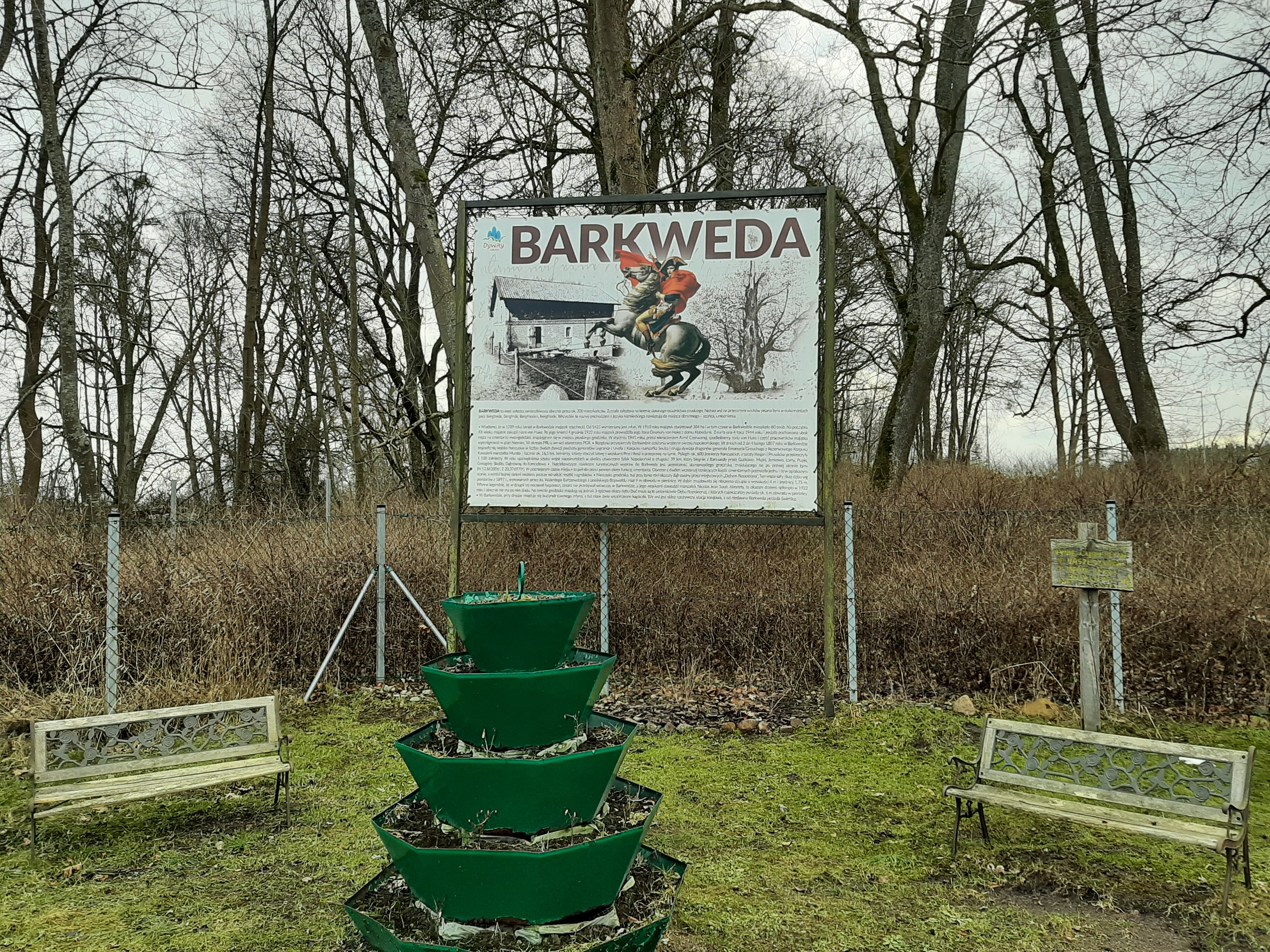
The square with a memorial banner in Barkweda

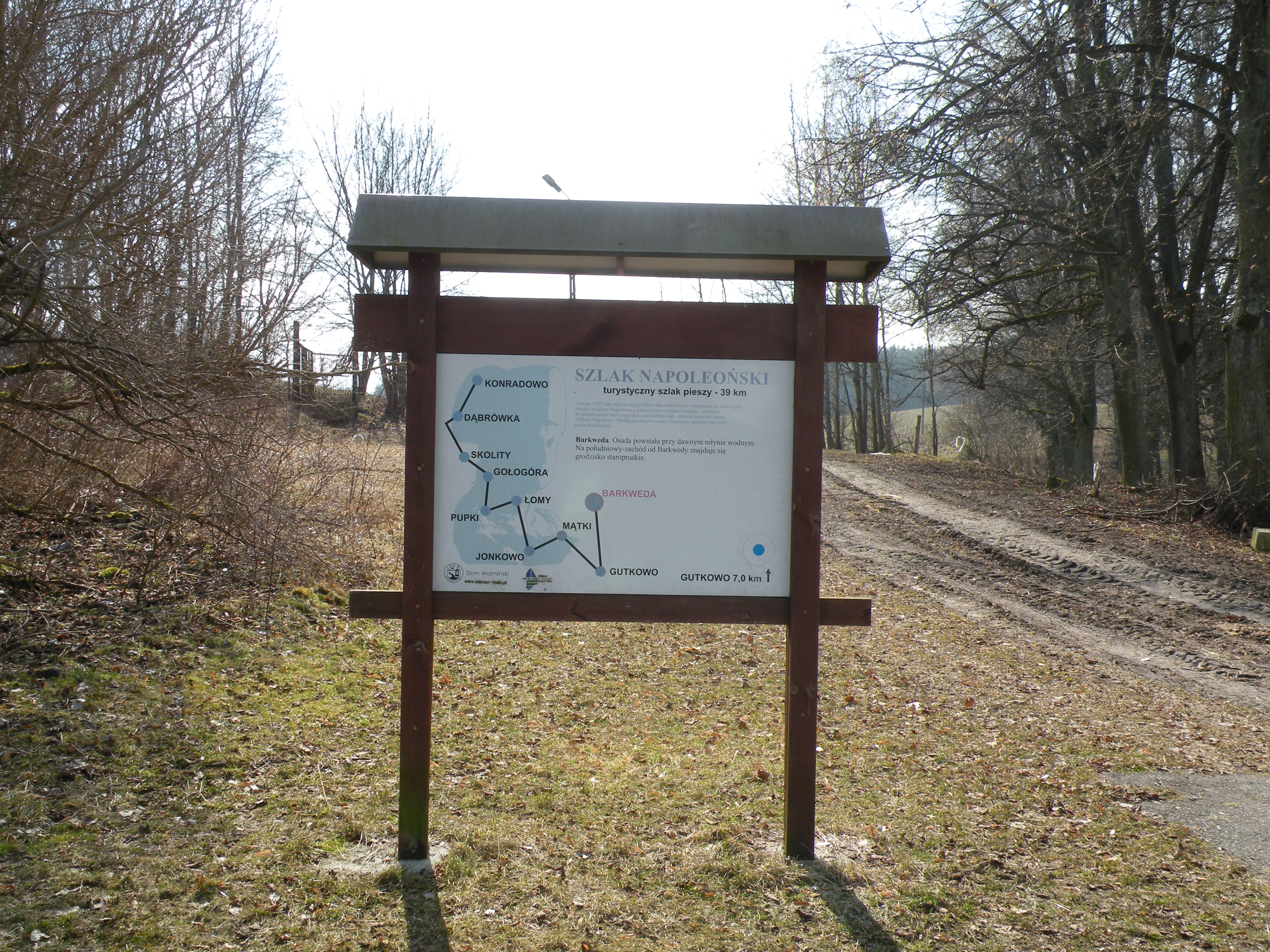
Napoleonic hiking trail in southern Warmia

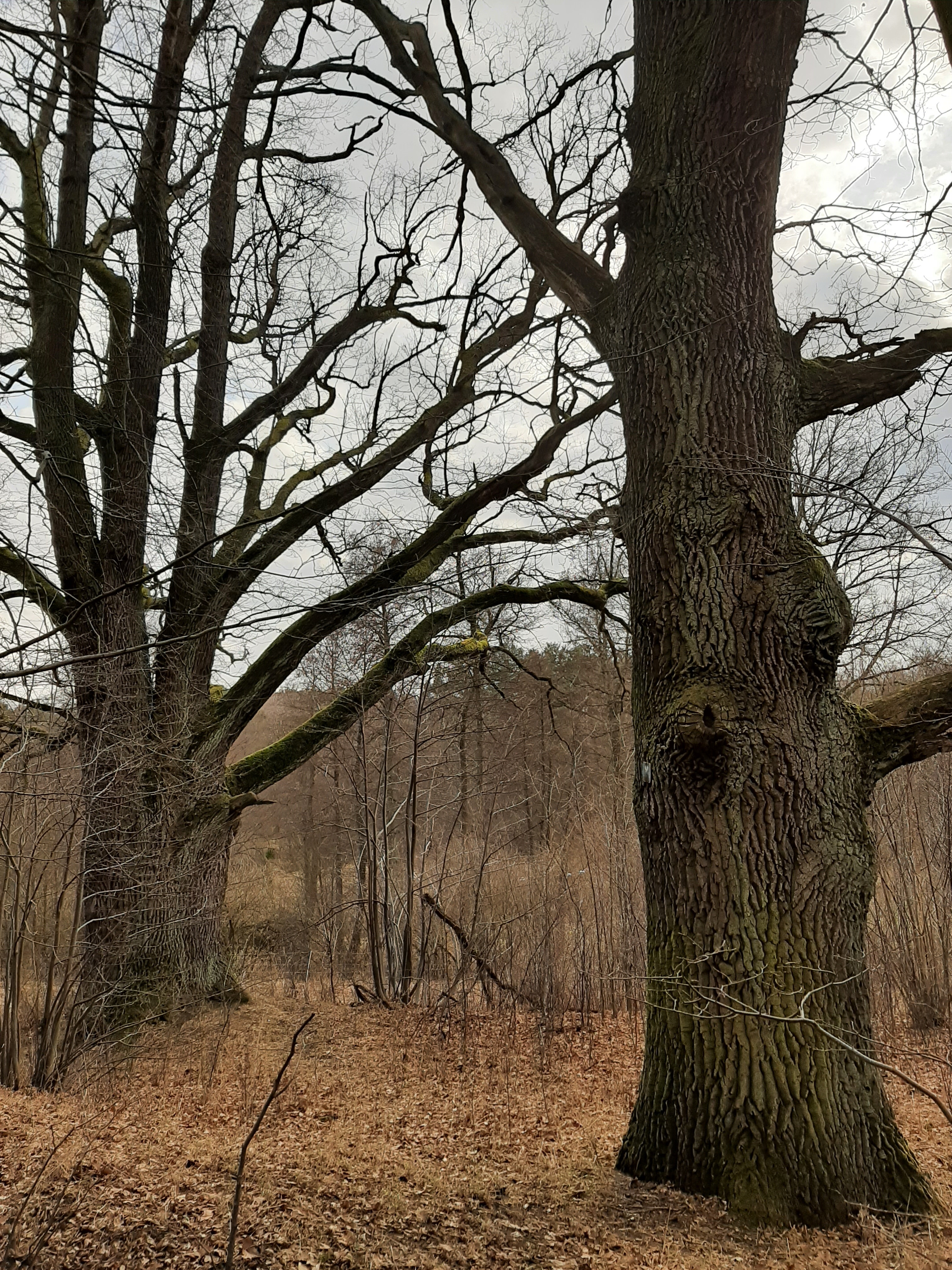
Napoleon's Oaks in Barkweda, in Old Prussian hillfort

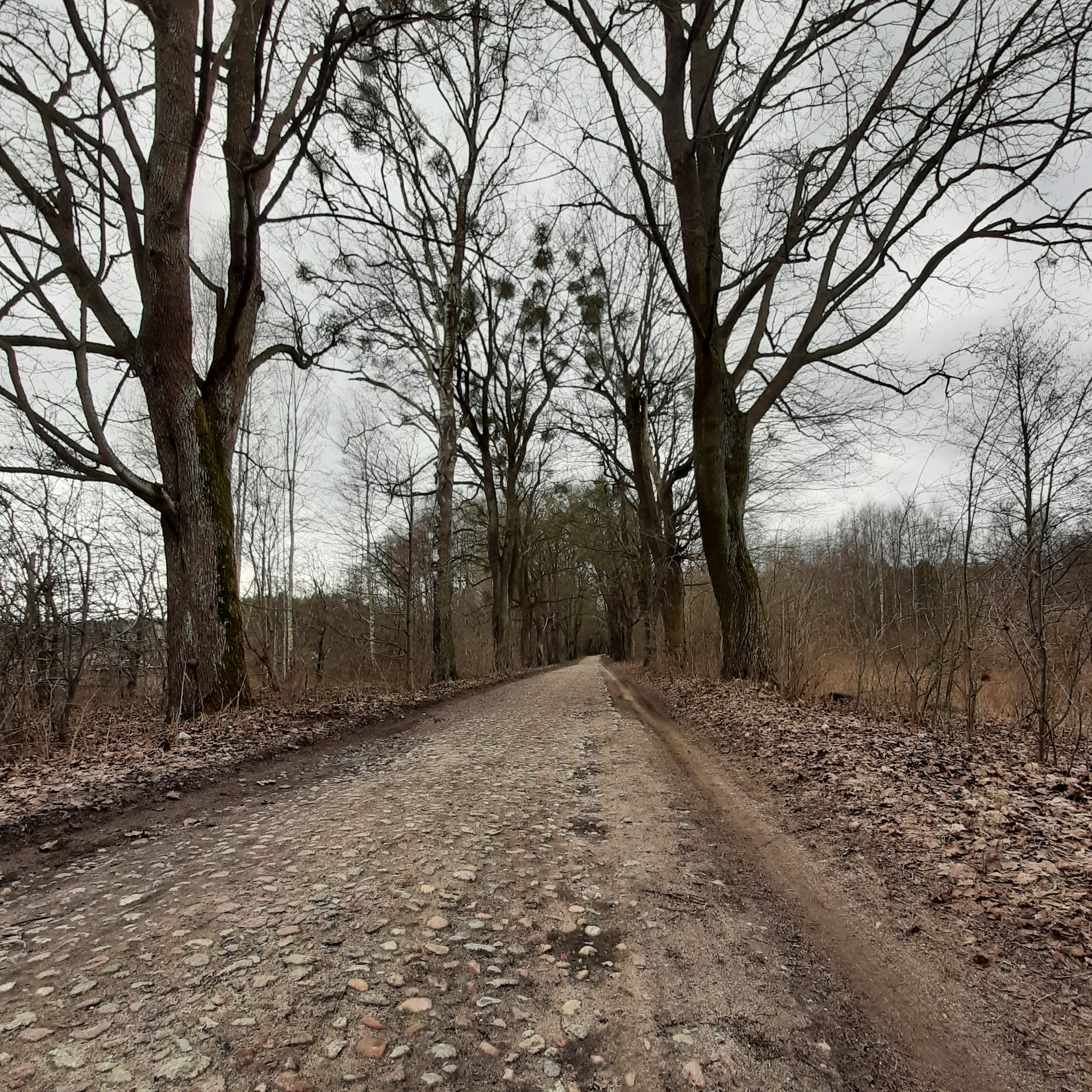
Old road from Gutkowo to Jonkowo

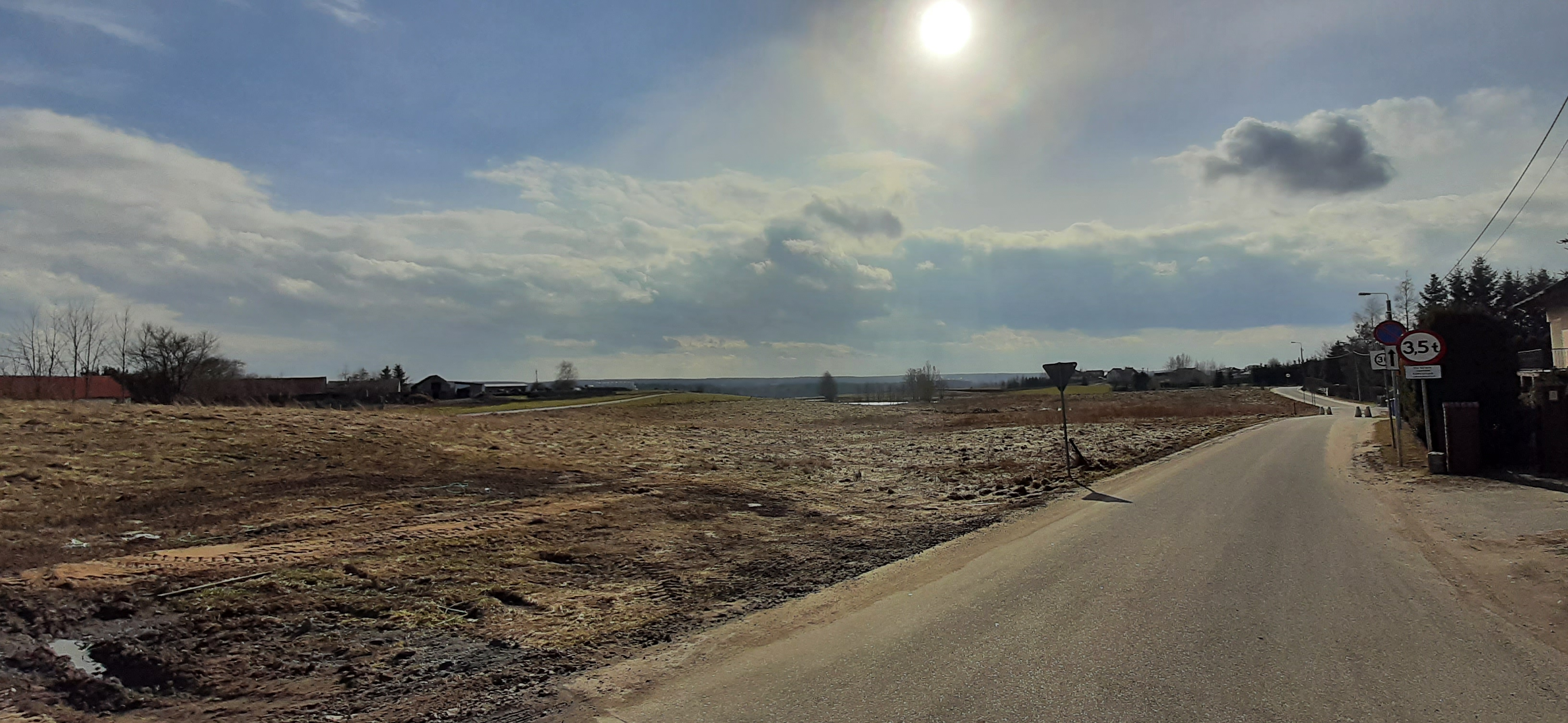
The plateau near Jonkowo, the place of the general French attack

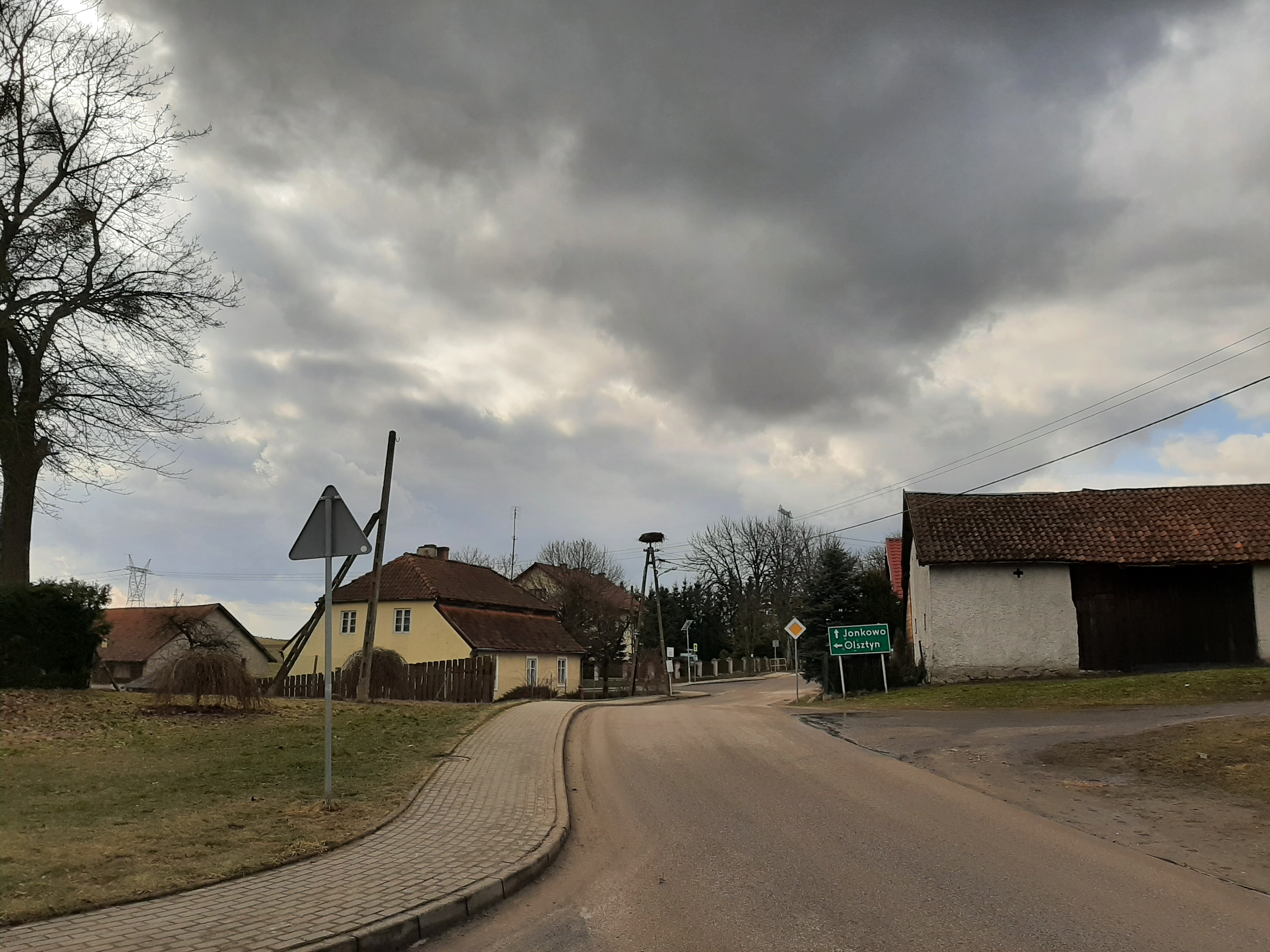
Mątki (Mondtken), the location of Kamensky's division, present view

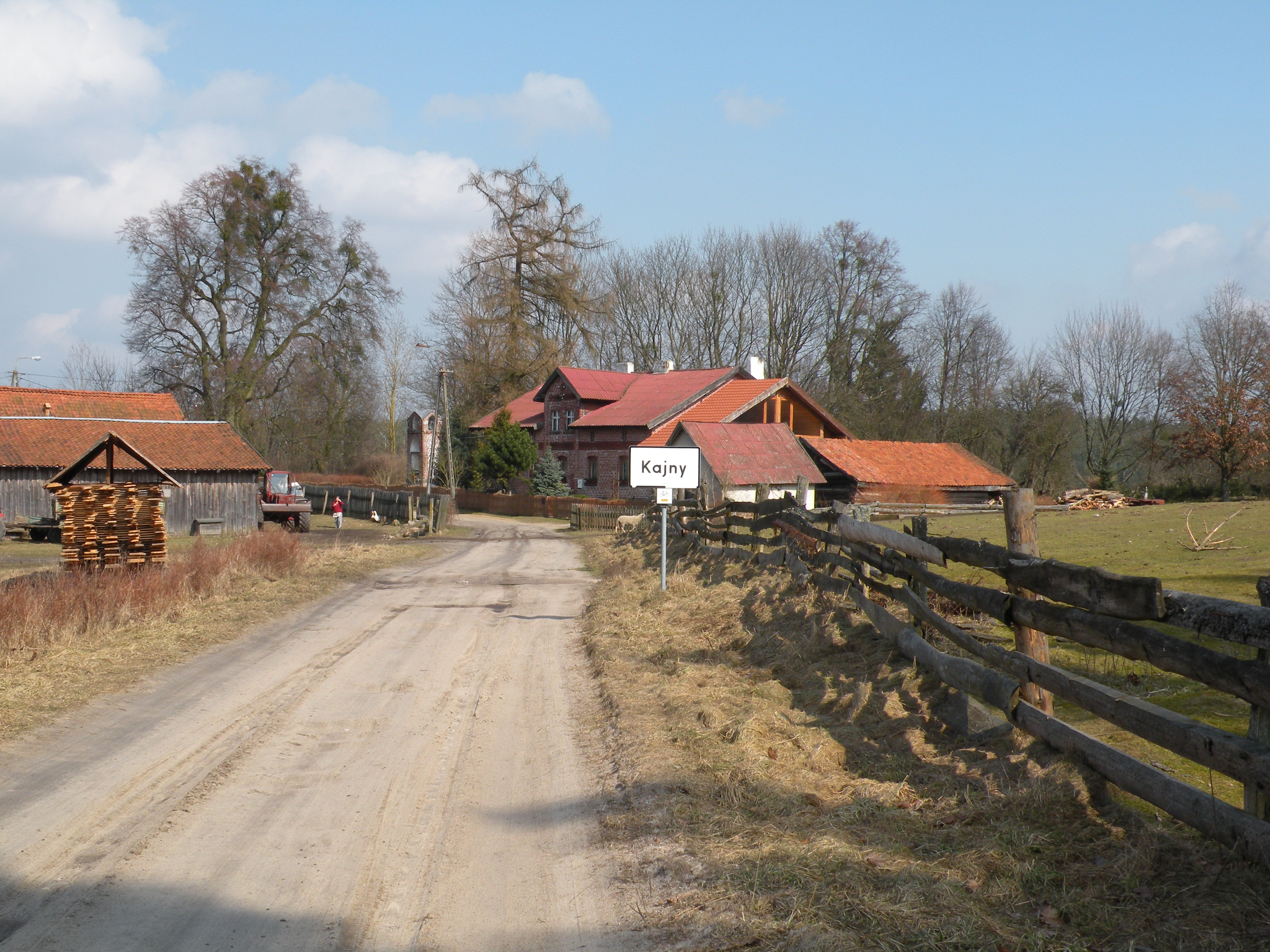
Kajny (Kainen), present view

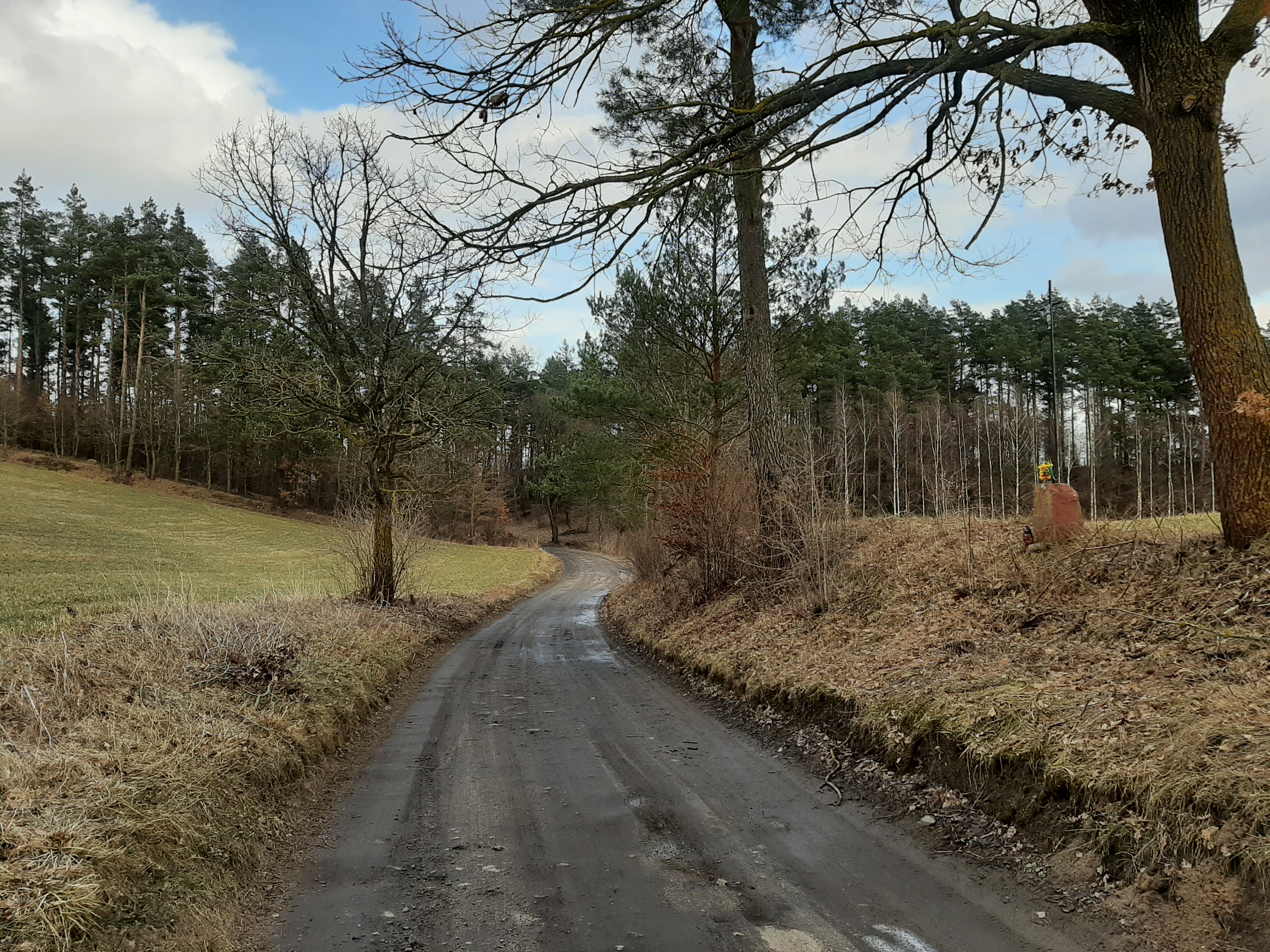
The road from Mątki to Kajny

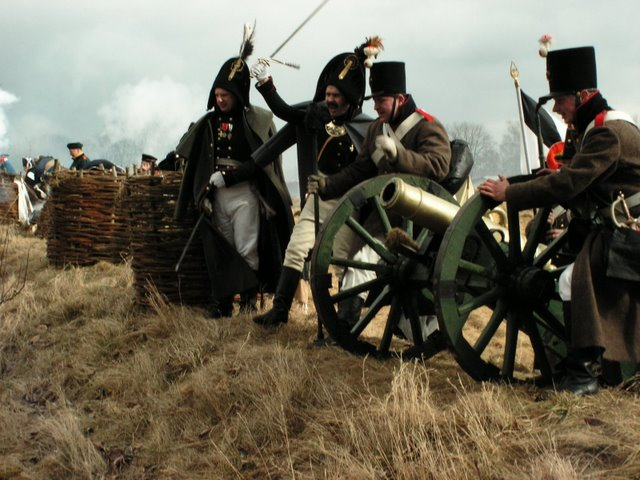
The inscenization of the battle in Jonkowo in 2008
