= Andrew Bloch =

British communications executive

- Education: Haberdashers' Aske's School; University of Manchester Institute of Science and Technology (BSc in Management Sciences, 1995)
- Occupation: Communications executive
- Known for: Co-founder of Frank PR

Andrew Bloch is a British communications executive and the co-founder of the consumer public relations agency Frank PR based in the UK. He serves as a long term publicist to Lord Sugar and has managed public relations for The Apprentice winners and their businesses since the show's launch in 2005. In 2021, Bloch was named as one of the Top 100 most Influential PR People in the World by Propel PRM.

== Early life and education ==
In 1992, Andrew Bloch graduated from Haberdashers' Aske's School. In 1995, he earned a degree in Management Sciences from the University of Manchester Institute of Science and Technology.

== Career ==
In 2012, Bloch, then the vice chairman of Frank PR, expanded the firm into the American market by establishing Frank PR USA in New York. In 2021, Frank completed a management buyout, making Frank PR an independent business again.

In 2021, Bloch was named as one of the Top 100 most Influential PR People in the World by Propel PRM. In 2023, Andrew Bloch & Associates was named Boutique Marketing Agency of the Year by the Corporate LiveWire Global Awards.

Bloch is a partner at AAR, where he leads the PR, social media, content, and influencer practices. He is a partner at PCB Partners, advising on acquisitions and sales in the marketing services industry.

He serves as a PR advisor to Lord Sugar and manages public relations for The Apprentice winners and their businesses since the show's launch in 2005.
