= Jonkowo =

- Village
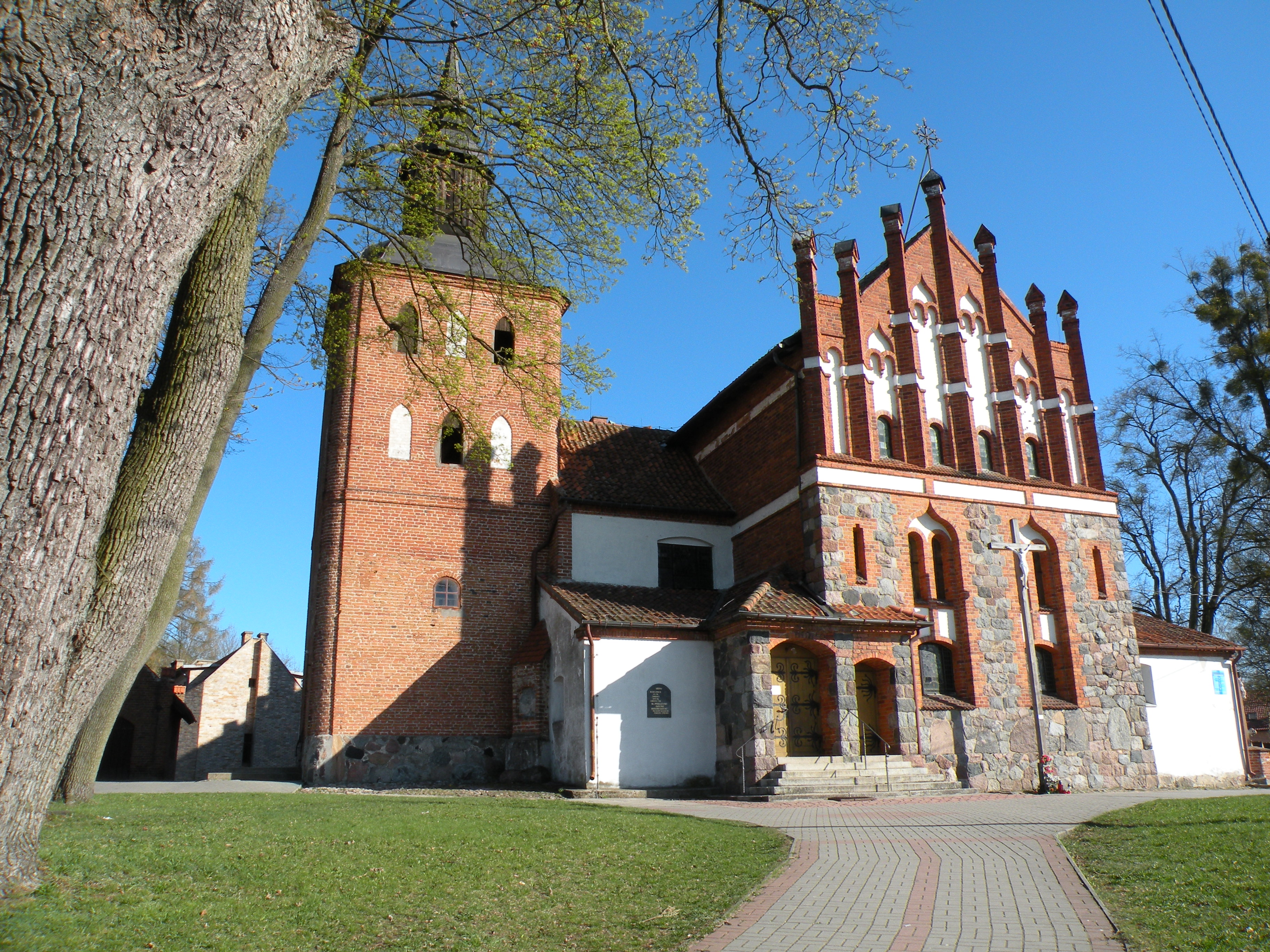
- Saint John the Baptist church in Jonkowo

- Location within Poland
- Coordinates: 53°49′32″N 20°18′29″E
- Country: Poland
- Voivodeship: Warmian-Masurian
- County: Olsztyn
- Gmina: Jonkowo
- Founded: 1345
- Population: 1,500
- Time zone: UTC+1 (CET)
  - Summer (DST): UTC+2 (CEST)
- ISO 3166 code: POL
- Vehicle registration: NOL
- Primary airport: Olsztyn-Mazury Airport

Jonkowo [jɔnˈkɔvɔ] is a village in Olsztyn County, Warmian-Masurian Voivodeship, in northern Poland. It is the seat of the gmina (administrative district) called Gmina Jonkowo. It is located in Warmia.

== History ==
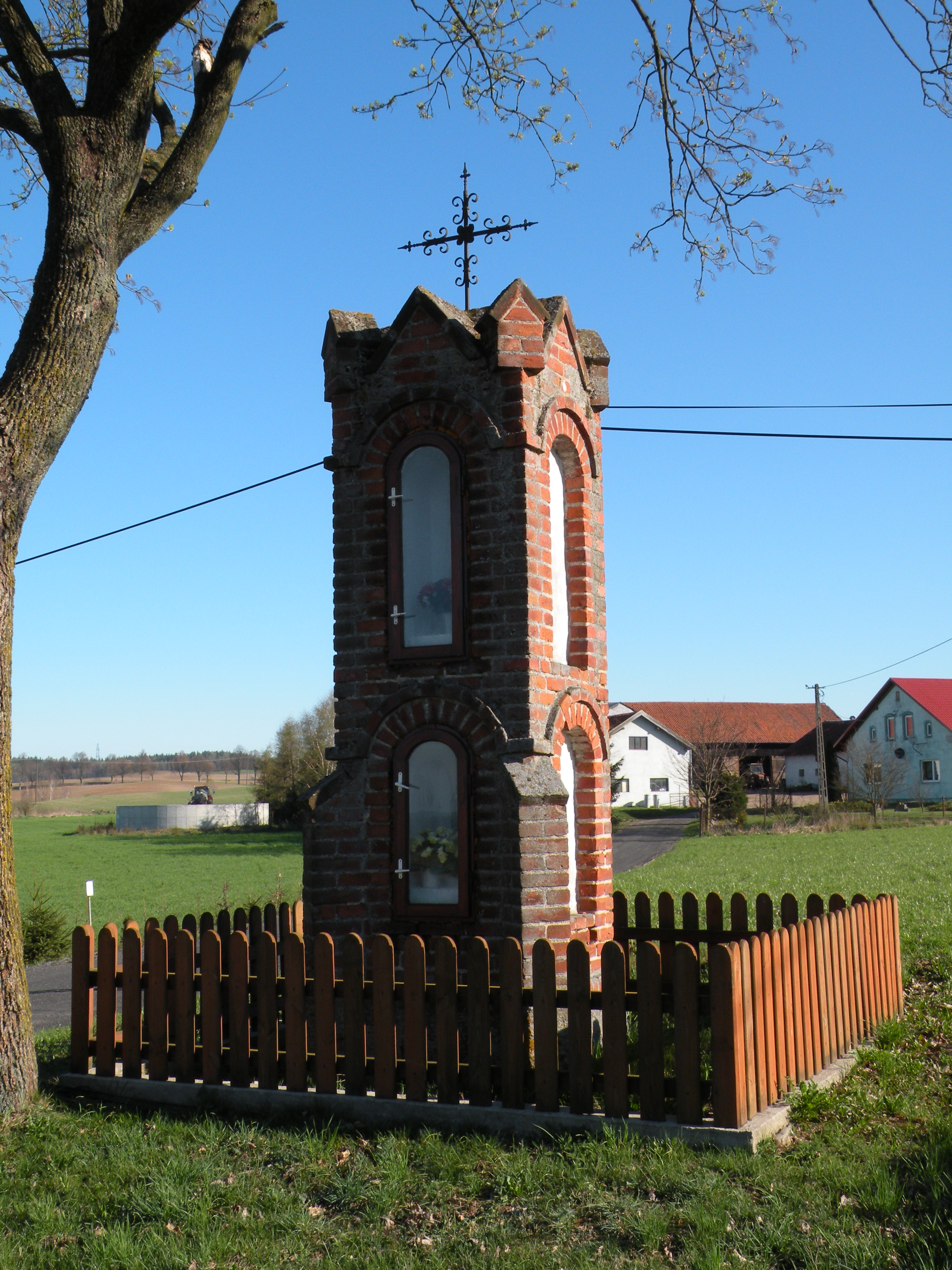
Old Warmian wayside shrine

The village was established in 1345 when Warmian bishop Herman of Prague issued its first privilege confirming the foundation. Jonkowo was founded in the Old Prussian territory called Gudikus. The name of the village comes from the name of its founder and first administrator, Jonekon (Joneko) from the village of Bartołty (now Bartołty Wielkie). In the founding act of Jonkowo, the village administrator was granted six tax-free włókas of land and also further six włókas in exchange for military services in case of war. The village administrator also received a permit to run an inn with a beer tavern and the right to fish in the lake called Rauthschoys and to hunt in the surrounding forests (for his own needs). Five włókas of land were allocated to the endowment of the Catholic parish. The first church was built in 1350–1375 and it was wooden. In 1356, the bishop of Warmia, Jan Stryprock, enrolled Jonkowo in the collegiate chapter in Dobre Miasto. During the Polish–Teutonic War of 1414, Jonkowo was burnt down and plundered. Another location act for the re-settlement of Jonkowo was issued by the bishop of Warmia, Jan Abezier in 1421. The location privilege was issued for Jacob Knosl and Bartusch Prus.

In 1454, King Casimir IV Jagiellon incorporated the region to the Kingdom of Poland upon the request of the Prussian Confederation. During the subsequent Thirteen Years' War, in 1462, Jonkowo was burnt and plundered by the Teutonic Knights. After the war, in 1466, the Teutonic Knights renounced any claims to Warmia, and it was confirmed as part of Poland. Jonkowo was settled by new settlers in 1516, 1518 and 1521 as the administrator of the Warmia Chapter property. Copernicus visited Jonkowo twice.

The parish in Jonkowo appeared on the list of Warmian parishes at the end of the 15th century, and at the beginning of the 16th century. On September 18, 1580, the 14th-century church was consecrated by Bishop Marcin Kromer and named after St. John the Baptist.

In 1656 there were two sołtys (village administrators) in Jonkowo, two free farmers, 14 peasants and one inn.

During the Swedish invasion of Poland (1701–1706), in 1703, Jonkowo (as well as other nearby villages) was burdened with a high contribution, which led to its ruin. 124 inhabitants died in Jonkowo during the plague epidemic in 1710. After the epidemic in Warmia ceased, when the cult of St. Roch, the patron saint against the plague, developed, Jonkowo was visited by numerous Warmian pilgrimages. At that time, the sołtys in Jonkowo were Marcin Barczewski and Jan Lewandowski. In 1714, the church was extended on the north and south sides. On June 14, 1715, the church was consecrated again by the Auxiliary Bishop of Warmia, Jan Franciszek Kurdwanowski, in honor of St. John the Baptist and St. Roch. After another reconstruction, the church in Jonkowo was re-consecrated by Bishop Ignacy Krasicki on October 28, 1789. Bishop Krasicki encouraged the local population to maintain a newly built school, to which the Prussian government donated 100 thalers. At that time, the school teacher was Józef Bolewski.

During the First Partition of Poland, Jonkowo was annexed by Prussia. On 3 February 1807, near Jonkowo, a clash known as the Battle of Olsztyn or the Battle of Jonkowo took place. At that time, the French Emperor Napoleon stayed with his troops in Olsztyn, Gutkowo and Jonkowo.

For centuries, the population remained Polish by ethnicity and Catholic by confession. In the late 19th century, the village had a population of 692. In the mid-nineteenth century, slow economic emigration to Germany began. In 1914, another expansion of the church took place.

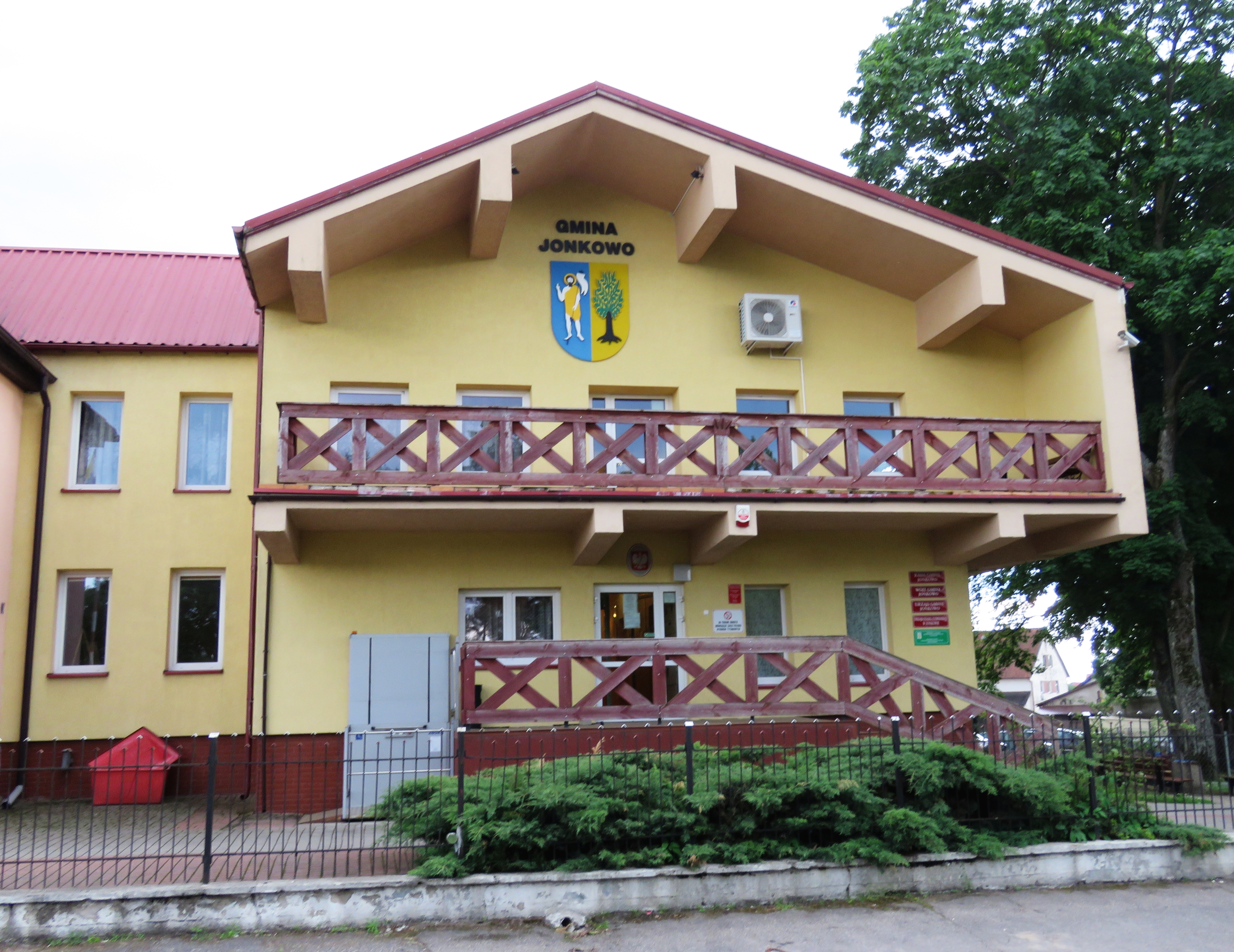
Gmina office

Until 1954, Jonkowo was the seat of the Wrzesina commune.

== Transport ==
There is a train station in Jonkowo.

== Sports ==
The local football club is GLKS Jonkowo. It competes in the lower leagues.
