= Goodkind =

Goodkind is a surname. Notable people with the surname include:

- Graham Goodkind (born 1966), English businessman
- Henry M. Goodkind (1900–1970), American philatelist
- Morris Goodkind (1888–1968), American engineer
- Terry Goodkind (1948–2020), American writer
- Tom Goodkind (1953-2019), American Musician

== See also ==
- Godkin
