= Pupki =

Pupki may refer to the following places:

- Pupki, Podlaskie Voivodeship (north-east Poland)
- Pupki, Olsztyn County in Warmian-Masurian Voivodeship (north Poland)
- Pupki, Ostróda County in Warmian-Masurian Voivodeship (north Poland)
