= Stare Kawkowo =

- Village
- Location within Poland
- Coordinates: 53°53′N 20°12′E
- Country: Poland
- Voivodeship: Warmian-Masurian
- County: Olsztyn
- Gmina: Jonkowo

Stare Kawkowo [ˈstarɛ kafˈkɔvɔ] (German: Alt Kockendorf) is a village in the administrative district of Gmina Jonkowo, within Olsztyn County, Warmian-Masurian Voivodeship, in northern Poland.
