= Nowe Kawkowo =

- Village
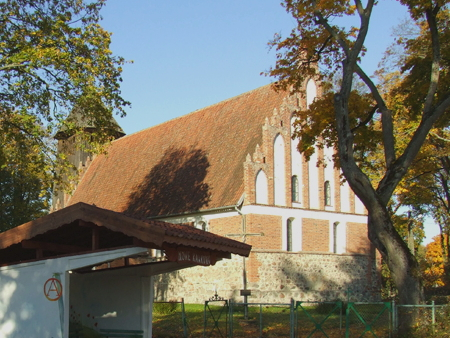
- St. John the Evangelist church in Nowe Kawkowo

- Location within Poland
- Coordinates: 53°51′N 20°12′E
- Country: Poland
- Voivodeship: Warmian-Masurian
- County: Olsztyn
- Gmina: Jonkowo

Nowe Kawkowo [ˈnɔvɛ kafˈkɔvɔ] is a village in the administrative district of Gmina Jonkowo, within Olsztyn County, Warmian-Masurian Voivodeship, in northern Poland.
