= Stękiny =

- Village
- Location within Poland
- Coordinates: 53°48′N 20°13′E
- Country: Poland
- Voivodeship: Warmian-Masurian
- County: Olsztyn
- Gmina: Jonkowo

Stękiny [stɛnˈkinɨ] is a village in the administrative district of Gmina Jonkowo, within Olsztyn County, Warmian-Masurian Voivodeship, in northern Poland.

Before 1772 the area was part of Kingdom of Poland, and in 1772–1945 it belonged to Prussia and Germany (East Prussia).
