= Polejki =

- Village
- Location within Poland
- Coordinates: 53°53′N 20°21′E
- Country: Poland
- Voivodeship: Warmian-Masurian
- County: Olsztyn
- Gmina: Jonkowo

Polejki [pɔˈlɛi̯ki] is a village in the administrative district of Gmina Jonkowo, within Olsztyn County, Warmian–Masurian Voivodeship, in northern Poland.

Before 1772 the area was part of Kingdom of Poland, and in 1772–1945 it belonged to Prussia and Germany (East Prussia).
