= Daily Express (Dublin) =

Irish newspaper

The Daily Express of Dublin (often referred to as the Dublin Daily Express, to distinguish it from the Daily Express of London) was an Irish newspaper published from 1851 to June 1921, and then continued for registration purposes until 1960.

It was a unionist newspaper. From 1917, its title was the Daily Express and Irish Daily Mail. In its heyday, it had the highest circulation of any paper in Ireland.

== History ==
It was founded by the Dublin solicitor John Robinson, who remained its proprietor until about 1889, when he sold it to James Poole Maunsell.

In his Post Famine Ireland (2006), Desmond Keenan says of the newspaper:

The Dublin Daily Express, a Conservative newspaper established in 1851, had for a time the greatest circulation of any paper in Ireland. It was regarded as the organ of the gentry, Protestant clergy, and the professional and commercial classes who afterwards flocked to the Irish Times.

In 1858, Karl Marx, writing in the New York Tribune, called the paper "the Government organ":

The shifts the Government is driven to may be judged from the manoeuvres of The Dublin Daily Express, the Government organ, which day by day treats its readers to false rumours of murders committed, armed men marauding, and midnight meetings taking place. To its intense disgust, the men killed return from their graves, and protest in its own columns against being so disposed of by the editor.

The paper's first editor, James Godkin, although brought up as a Roman Catholic, had served as a Congregational minister in Armagh and as a general missionary for the Irish Evangelical Society. He was the author of A Guide from the Church of Rome to the Church of Christ (1836) and in 1838 had founded the Christian Patriot newspaper in Belfast. He was also the author of a prize-winning essay called The Rights of Ireland (1845).

In December 1858, Lola Montez, visiting Dublin, wrote an angry but inaccurate letter to the editor of the Daily Express dealing with events which had taken place almost fifteen years earlier. She insisted that, when Dujarier died, she was living in the house of a Dr and Mrs Azan, and that "the good Queen of Bavaria wept bitterly when she left Munich." The newspaper's editor responded in kind, declaring "It is now well established that Lola Montez was born in 1824, her father being the son of a baronet."

In November 1881, Charles Boycott faced severe difficulties from the Irish Land League on the estate of John Crichton, 3rd Earl Erne, and men of the Orange Order mounted the Lough Mask House Relief Expedition. The Daily Express donated food and supplies. At the time it was owned by Lord Ardilaun.

Standish James O'Grady (1846–1928), a figure in the Irish Literary Revival and author of a History of Ireland, worked on the Daily Express as a journalist until 1898.

The radio pioneer Guglielmo Marconi reported for the newspaper on the Kingstown Regatta of July 1898, and he did so by sending Wireless messages from a steam tug which were then telephoned to Dublin. This has been claimed as the first live transmission of a sporting event anywhere in the world.

In 1899, the paper was the forum for the 'Atkinson controversy' about the evidence of Robert Atkinson to the Intermediate Education (Ireland) Commission, and in a letter to the paper published on 15 February 1899, Douglas Hyde, a future President of Ireland, referred to "that Stygian flood of black ignorance of everything Irish which, Lethe-like, rolls through the portals of my beloved Alma Mater."

In 1902 and 1903, James Joyce wrote many reviews for the newspaper, and its pro-British reputation is mentioned in his story "The Dead". One of Joyce's reviews troubled the Daily Express's editor, Ernest Longworth, so much that he broke with tradition and added Joyce's initials to it. Published on 26 March 1903, this was a hostile review of Lady Gregory's Poets and Dreamers.

During the Easter Rising of 1916, rebels entered the grounds of Dublin Castle and took possession of the offices of the Dublin Daily Express, from the roof of which they could command the approaches to the Castle from Dame Street, Castle Street, and Cork Hill to the Upper Castle Yard. British troops regained possession later the same day.

Following the Irish War of Independence and the subsequent creation of the Irish Free State, the Daily Express ceased publications. However, it continued to exist for registration purposes until 1960.

Archived copies of the newspaper are available on microfilm in the National Library of Ireland.

== Editors ==
- James Godkin (from 1851)
- George Linnaeus Banks (1850s)
- Dr G. V. Patton (until his death on 25 March 1898)
- John Edward Healey (to 1907, when he became editor of The Irish Times)
- Ernest Victor Longworth (lived from 1874 to 1935; years of editorship unknown)
- James Young McPeake (d. 21 September 1924)
- Henry Stuart Doig (born 27 April 1874, died 3 April 1931), editor at the time of the Easter Rising
