= Bałąg =

- Village
- Location within Poland
- Coordinates: 53°49′32″N 20°13′8″E
- Country: Poland
- Voivodeship: Warmian-Masurian
- County: Olsztyn
- Gmina: Jonkowo

Bałąg [ˈbawɔnk] is a village in the administrative district of Gmina Jonkowo, within Olsztyn County, Warmian-Masurian Voivodeship, in northern Poland.
