= Kajny =

- Village
- Location within Poland
- Coordinates: 53°52′N 20°23′E
- Country: Poland
- Voivodeship: Warmian-Masurian
- County: Olsztyn
- Gmina: Jonkowo

Kajny [ˈkai̯nɨ] is a village in the administrative district of Gmina Jonkowo, within Olsztyn County, Warmian-Masurian Voivodeship, in northern Poland.

Before 1772 the area was part of Kingdom of Poland, and in 1772–1945 it belonged to Prussia and Germany (East Prussia).

A hydraulic ram (c. 1897) in Kajny
