= Łomy, Warmian-Masurian Voivodeship =

Łomy
- Village
- Location within Poland
- Coordinates: 53°51′44″N 20°17′17″E
- Country: Poland
- Voivodeship: Warmian-Masurian
- County: Olsztyn
- Gmina: Jonkowo
- Population: 680

Łomy [ˈwɔmɨ] is a village in the administrative district of Gmina Jonkowo, within Olsztyn County, Warmian-Masurian Voivodeship, in northern Poland.

Before 1772 the area was part of Kingdom of Poland, and in 1772–1945 it belonged to Prussia and Germany (East Prussia).
