= Gmina Jonkowo =

Gmina Jonkowo Jonkowo Commune
- Gmina
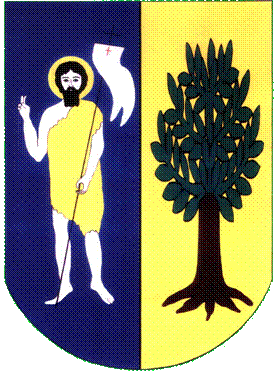
- Coat of arms
- Interactive map of Gmina Jonkowo
- Coordinates (Jonkowo): 53°49′32″N 20°18′29″E
- Country: Poland
- Voivodeship: Warmian-Masurian
- County: Olsztyn County
- Seat: Jonkowo

Area
  - Total: 168.19 km^{2} (64.94 sq mi)

Population (2006)
  - Total: 5,719
  - Density: 34.00/km^{2} (88.07/sq mi)
- Website: http://www.jonkowo.pl

Gmina Jonkowo is a rural gmina (administrative district) in Olsztyn County, Warmian-Masurian Voivodeship, in northern Poland. Its seat is the village of Jonkowo, which lies approximately 14 kilometres (9 mi) west of the regional capital Olsztyn.

The gmina covers an area of 168.19 square kilometres (64.9 sq mi), and as of 2006 its total population was 5,719.

== Villages ==
Gmina Jonkowo contains the villages and settlements of Bałąg, Gamerki Małe, Gamerki Wielkie, Garzewko, Giedajty, Godki, Gutkowo, Jonkowo, Kajny, Łomy, Mątki, Nowe Kawkowo, Polejki, Porbady, Pupki, Stare Kawkowo, Stękiny, Szałstry, Szelągowo, Warkały, Węgajty, Wilimowo and Wołowno.

== Neighbouring gminas ==
Gmina Jonkowo is bordered by the city of Olsztyn and by the gminas of Dywity, Gietrzwałd, Łukta and Świątki.
