= Barkweda =

- Village
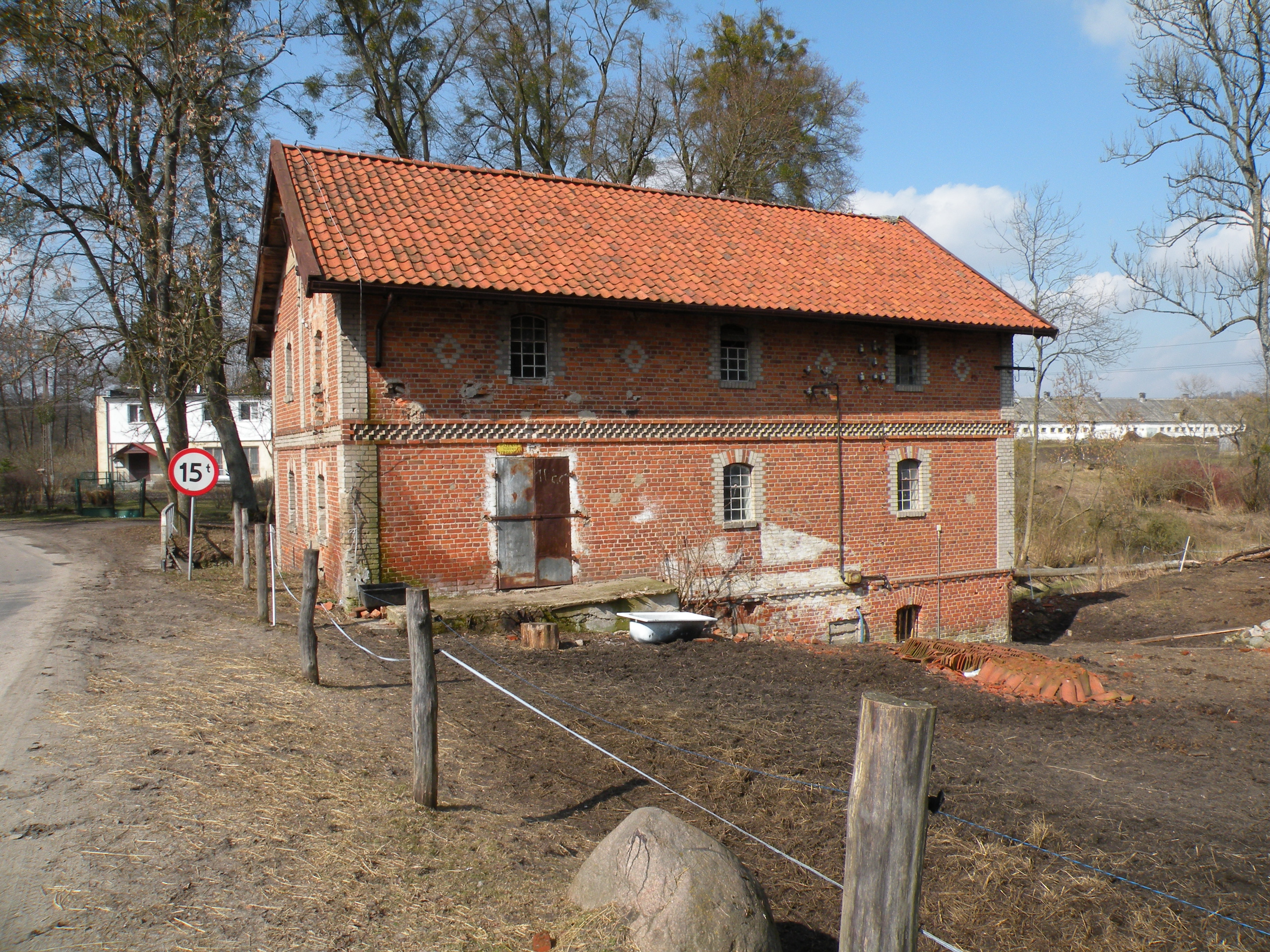
- Old watermill in Barkweda

- Location within Poland
- Coordinates: 53°51′46″N 20°23′49″E
- Country: Poland
- Voivodeship: Warmian-Masurian
- County: Olsztyn
- Gmina: Dywity
- Time zone: UTC+1 (CET)
  - Summer (DST): UTC+2 (CEST)
- Vehicle registration: NOL

Barkweda [barkˈfɛda] is a village in the administrative district of Gmina Dywity, within Olsztyn County, Warmian-Masurian Voivodeship, in northern Poland. It is located on the Łyna River and Lake Mosąg in Warmia.
