= Pupki, Olsztyn County =

Pupki
- Village
- Location within Poland
- Coordinates: 53°52′N 20°15′E
- Country: Poland
- Voivodeship: Warmian-Masurian
- County: Olsztyn
- Gmina: Jonkowo

Pupki ([ˈpupki]; translation: Small Bottoms) is a village in the administrative district of Gmina Jonkowo, within Olsztyn County, Warmian-Masurian Voivodeship, in northern Poland.
