= Gamerki Małe =

- Village
- Location within Poland
- Coordinates: 53°50′48″N 20°9′23″E
- Country: Poland
- Voivodeship: Warmian-Masurian
- County: Olsztyn
- Gmina: Jonkowo
- Population: 20

Gamerki Małe [ɡaˈmɛrki ˈmawɛ] is a village in the administrative district of Gmina Jonkowo, within Olsztyn County, Warmian-Masurian Voivodeship, in northern Poland.
