= Frank PR =

Frank Public Relations Limited
- Industry: Public Relations
- Founded: 14 August 2000
- Founder: Graham Goodkind
- Headquarters: London, United Kingdom
- Key people: Graham Goodkind; Alex Grier; Bianca Lee-Chang
- Website: welcometofrank.com

Frank Public Relations Limited, trading as Frank PR, is a consumer public relations agency based in Farringdon, London, United Kingdom.

It was founded in September 2000 by CEO Graham Goodkind. Graham still leads the business today, alongside MD Alex Grier and managing partners Melissa Robinson and Bianca Lee-Chang.

Frank PR is now an independent agency having completed an MBO in March 2021 from Enero Group, a specialist marketing and communications services company that is listed on the Australian Securities Exchange. In October 2007, Frank PR was originally acquired by Photon Group Limited (Photon), who subsequently changed its name to Enero Group on the 3rd of July 2012.

Frank PR specialises in providing consumer public relations consultancy services to leading brands and products, challenger brands, entrepreneurial organisations, charities and multinationals. As well as traditional consumer PR and media relations, Frank also has specialist teams offering social, digital, influencer, experiential, celebrity, corporate social responsibility, purpose-led and product placement based campaigns. Clients (as at April 2022) include Innocent Drinks, Huawei, Direct Line Group, TheFork, Skoda, KIND Snacks, G2 Esports, Herbalife and Weetabix. The agency still remains the only one to have won Marketing's PR Agency of the Year three times.

A recent campaign for Weetabix is among the agency's most recognized works. During the UK lockdown, Frank launched a social media campaign suggesting Heinz Baked Beans as a topping for Weetabix biscuits. The unconventional pairing gained significant traction, generating over a million shares within hours and prompting similar responses from other consumer brands. The engagement was so widespread that the campaign was even mentioned during a debate in the Houses of Commons.

The campaign resulted in a 15% sales uplift for Weetabix in that period and won a plethora of industry awards for Frank, including: Davos Communications Awards- Best PR Campaign; UK Social Media Awards- Best use of Twitter; UK Agency Awards- Campaign Effectiveness Award; UK Agency Awards- Best social media Award; UK Social Media Awards- Best Audience Engagement Campaign; UK Social Media Awards- Best use of social media for FMCG; UK Social Media Awards- Best Low Budget Campaign; The Drum Awards for Marketing- Social media Award; The Drum Awards for Marketing- FMCG Award; PR Moment Awards- Social media Campaign of the Year; Creative Moment- Funniest Campaign of the Year; Creative Moment, Stunt of the Year; PR Week- FMCG campaign of the year; Marketing Week Masters- Best Use of a Small Budget; Digital Impact Awards - Best use of Digital and The Digital Impact Awards - Best use of social media.

Frank is a member of the Public Relations and Communications Association (PRCA). Graham and Alex are listed in the 2022 edition of the PR Week UK Power Book as two of the most influential PR professionals in the country.
