= Graham Goodkind =

Entrepreneur (born 1966)

Graham Clifford Goodkind (born 18 January 1966) is an English businessman.

== Early life and education ==
Goodkind was born on 18 January 1966 in Dollis Hill, Willesden, to Derek Goodkind, a furrier and his wife Pessa. Goodkind is an only child. He was educated at the University College School, Hampstead and then graduated from the London Metropolitan University, where he read Business Studies and Marketing.

== Career ==
After graduating, Goodkind took up the offer of work experience at Lynne Franks PR in December 1989. He got a full-time job as a trainee account executive at Lynne Franks PR after a month and in seven years worked his way up to the position of managing director.

Goodkind subsequently left to set up an internet venture at the beginning of the dotcom boom called Funmail, later re-branded as another.com. It offered free web-based email with many domains. Initially planning on listing on the AIM, the company instead accepted an offer instead from Eden, an investment company, to purchase a 20% stake for £6.5m, valuing the fledgling business at £31.25m. Graham, together with one other founder, sold his stake in the company a year later, before the dotcom bubble burst.

In September 2000, Graham founded Frank PR.

Graham is also a board member of Camden Town Unlimited, a business improvement district in Camden.
