= James Godkin =

James Godkin (1806 – 2 May 1879) was an Irish author and journalist who was influential on ecclesiastical and land questions.

== Early life and family ==
Godkin was born at Gorey in County Wexford, into a Roman Catholic farming family. As a young man he married Sarah, a daughter of Anthony Lawrence, described as a "comfortable proprietor" of County Wicklow, who was of Cromwellian settler ancestry. Together, they had three daughters and two sons, one of whom was Edwin Lawrence Godkin.

== Career ==
In 1834, Godkin was ordained as a Congregational minister and became a pastor in Armagh. He later worked as a missionary to Roman Catholics for the Irish Evangelical Society.

In 1836, he published A Guide from the Church of Rome to the Church of Christ and in 1838 founded the Christian Patriot newspaper at Belfast. His counter-blast to the Oxford Movement, The Touchstone of Orthodoxy and Apostolic Christianity, or, The People's Antidote Against Puseyism and Romanism, appeared in 1842. His religious work was forceful but showed little bigotry.

In 1842, Godkin became an ally of Charles Gavan Duffy on the Irish land question, and his interest in religion began to give way to his involvement in political protest. In 1845 it was revealed that he had written a prize-winning essay called The Rights of Ireland, and he parted company with the Irish Evangelical Society.

Godkin became a journalist. He edited the Derry Standard, and in 1848 he decided to abandon the ministry. He next moved to London, where he worked as a contributor to many publications, including the British Quarterly Review, the North British Review, the Standard of Freedom, the Belfast Independent, and the Freeman's Journal. In 1850, he was an active member of the Irish Tenant League. After two years in England, he moved to Dublin, where he took up the chief editorial post on the city's new Daily Express newspaper. Simultaneously, he was the Dublin correspondent of The Times of London.

Godkin was an influential writer on ecclesiastical and land questions. He published a treatise called Ireland and her Churches (1867), which advocated equal treatment of the churches in Ireland, as well as security of land tenure for the Irish people. It also contained outspoken views on the Famine, emigration, the Land War, and education. A British government led by Gladstone decided to support the disestablishment of the Church of Ireland, and the Irish Church Act 1869 took effect on 1 January 1871. In the 1860s, Godkin's work on Irish subjects appeared in the Fortnightly Review.

In 1869, he travelled around much of Ulster and the rest of Ireland to test public opinion on the land question, which led to his book The Land War in Ireland (1870). This coined the name of the ensuing Land War rural agitation of the 1880s. The book was influential as it coincided with the Dublin Land Conference in 1870 and the Landlord & Tenant (Ireland) Act 1870, the first of the reforming Irish Land Acts.

Godkin also published work on religion and education in India and a history of England from 1820 to 1861.

In 1873, on the recommendation of Gladstone, Queen Victoria granted Godkin a pension from the Civil List. When he died in 1879 he was living in England at Upper Norwood, Surrey and was buried at West Norwood Cemetery. One son, Edwin Lawrence Godkin, became a notable newspaper editor in America, editor-in-chief of The Nation and the Evening Post, and in 1870 declined the appointment of professor of history at Harvard.

Godkin's Ireland and Her Churches was republished in 2007.
