= Edwin Lawrence Godkin =

American journalist (1831–1902)

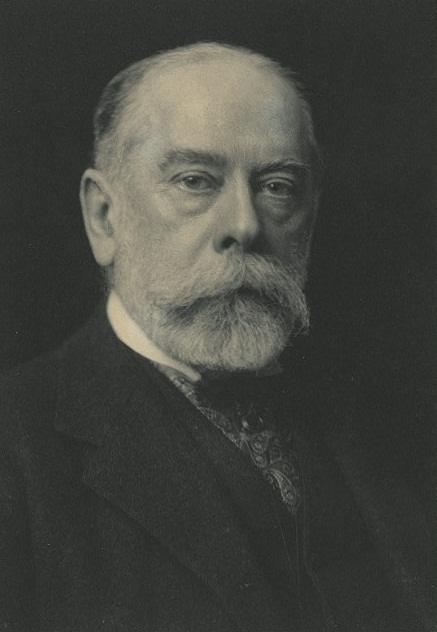
- Born: 2 October 1831 County Wicklow, Ireland
- Died: 21 May 1902 (aged 70) Devon, England
- Resting place: Saint Michael's Church, Haselbech, England
- Occupation: Journalist
- Education: Queen's College Belfast

Signature
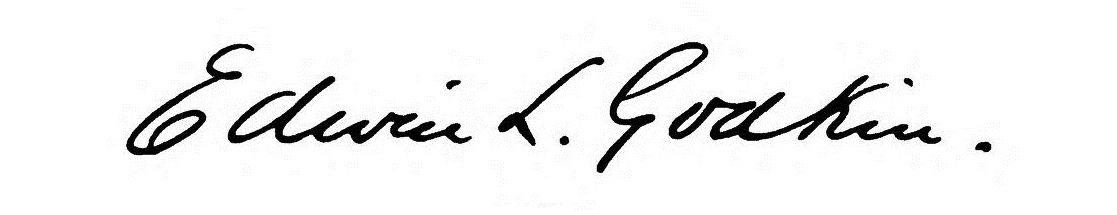

Edwin Lawrence Godkin (2 October 1831 – 21 May 1902) was an American journalist. He founded The Nation and was the editor-in-chief of the New York Evening Post from 1883 to 1899.

== Early life ==
Godkin was born in Moyne (a hamlet in Knockananna), County Wicklow, Ireland. His father, James Godkin, was a Congregationalist minister and a journalist. He studied law at Queen's College, Belfast, where he was the first president of the Literary and Scientific Society.

== Journalist ==
After leaving Belfast in 1851 and studying law in London, he was the Crimean War correspondent for the London Daily News in Turkey and Russia and was present at the Siege of Sevastopol.

In 1856, he emigrated to the United States and wrote letters to the News, giving his impressions of a tour on horseback he made of the southern states of the American Union. He studied law under David Dudley Field in New York City, and he was admitted to the bar in 1859. Because of his impaired health, he travelled in Europe in 1860 to 1862. He wrote for the News and The New York Times in 1862 to 1865.

In 1865, Godkin was asked by a group of abolitionists, led by landscape architect Frederick Law Olmsted, to found a new weekly political magazine. Godkin, who had been considering starting such a magazine for some time, agreed and became the first editor of The Nation when it began publishing in New York City in 1865.

Charles Eliot Norton gained supporters for the magazine in Boston, and James Miller McKim in Philadelphia. In 1866, two others joined Godkin as proprietors while he remained editor until the end of 1899. In 1881, he sold The Nation to the New York Evening Post, and he became an associate editor of the Post and then editor-in-chief in 1883 to 1899, succeeding Carl Schurz. Under Godkin's tenure, The Nation supported free trade and was anti-imperialist. It opposed socialism and women's suffrage.

Godkin was interested in Irish politics, and he often wrote about the Irish Question. Godkin was initially hostile to Irish nationalism, identifying it with the violence of Fenianism. However, in the 1880s, Godkin became a supporter of Irish Home Rule and endorsed the position of Charles Stewart Parnell. That resulted in Godkin becoming engaged in a controversy with Goldwin Smith, who opposed Home Rule. Under Godkin's leadership the Post broke with the Republican Party in the presidential campaign of 1884, when Godkin's opposition to nominee James G. Blaine did much to create the so-called Mugwump party, and his organ became thoroughly independent, as was seen when it attacked the Venezuelan policy of President Grover Cleveland, who had, in so many ways, approximated the ideal of the Post and Nation. He consistently advocated currency reform, the gold standard, a tariff for revenue only, and civil service reform, rendering the greatest aid to the last cause. His attacks on Tammany Hall were so frequent and so virulent that in 1894, he was sued for libel because of biographical sketches of certain leaders in that organization; the cases never went to trial.

In 1896, Godkin broke with the Democratic party after it nominated William Jennings Bryan. He supported the National Democratic Party (United States) third ticket because it championed a gold standard, limited government, and free trade. His opposition to the war with Spain and to imperialism was able and forcible.

== Later life ==
He retired from his editorial duties on the 30 December 1899, and he sketched his career in the Evening Post of that date. Although he recovered from a severe apoplectic stroke early in 1900, his health was shattered, and he died in Greenway, Devon, England, on the 21 May 1902. He was buried at Saint Michael's Church in Haselbech, Daventry District, Northamptonshire, England, near the home of the friend with whom he had been staying.

== Legacy ==
Godkin shaped the lofty and independent policy of the Post and The Nation, which had a small but influential and intellectual class of readers. However, he had none of the personal magnetism of Horace Greeley, for instance, and his superiority to the influence of popular feeling made Charles Dudley Warner describe The Nation as "the weekly judgment day". He was an economist of the school of John Stuart Mill, urged the necessity of the abstraction called economic man, and insisted that socialism, if put into practice, would not improve social and economic conditions in general. In politics, he was an enemy of both sentimentalism and loose theories in government.

Godkin had critics. In 1892, after Benjamin Butler published his memoir, Butler's Book, Godkin criticized it. Butler's biographer Elizabeth D. Leonard writes that Butler decided that "after decades of being 'the target of a few ignorant, irresponsible, mercenary news writers' — including The Nation's founder, E. L. Godkin, 'whose malevolence has exhausted the vocabulary of vituperation' — that he would let Butler's Book 'take care of itself....'"

After Godkin's death, William James wrote that Godkin "was certainly the towering influence in all thought concerning public affairs, and ... his influence has certainly been more pervasive than that of any other writer of the generation."

== Works ==
- The History of Hungary and the Magyars. New York: Alexander Montgomery, 1853.
- Government, "American Science Series," 1871.
- Henry G. Pearson: A Memorial Address delivered June 21, 1894. New York: Privately Printed, 1894.
- Reflections and Comments. New York: Charles Scribner's Sons, 1895.
- Problems of Modern Democracy. New York: Charles Scribner's Sons, 1897 (1st Pub. 1896).
- Unforeseen Tendencies of Democracy. New York: Houghton, Mifflin & Company, 1898.
- Life and Letters of Edwin Lawrence Godkin, Vol. 2. New York: The Macmillan Company, 1907.
- A Letter on Lincoln. Riverside, Conn.: The Hillacre Bookhouse, 1913.

=== Selected stories ===
- "Anglo-French Alliance and Orsini," The Knickerbocker, Vol. III, No. 1. July 1858.
- "French Invasion of England," The Knickerbocker, November 1859.
- "Commercial Immorality and Political Corruption," The North American Review, Vol. 107, No. 220, Jul., 1868.
- "The Prospects of the Political Art," The North American Review, Vol. 110, No. 227, Apr., 1870.
- "The Eastern Question," The North American Review, Vol. 124, No. 254, Jan., 1877.
- "The Political Outlook," The Century Magazine, February 1880.
- "The Civil Service Reform Controversy," The North American Review, Vol. 134, No. 305, Apr., 1882.
- "The Danger of an Office-Holding Aristocracy," The Century Magazine, June 1882.
- "American Home Rule." In: Handbook of Home Rule. London: Kegan Paul, Trench & Co., 1887.
- "A Lawyer's Objection to Home Rule." In: Handbook of Home Rule. London: Kegan Paul, Trench & Co., 1887.
- "American Opinion on the Irish Question," The Nineteenth Century, Vol. XXII, July/December 1887.
- "The Republican Party and the Negro," The Forum, Vol. VII, 1889.
- "Public Opinion and the Civil Service," The Forum, Vol. VIII, 1889.
- "Newspapers Here and Abroad," The North American Review, Vol. 150, No. 399, Feb., 1890.
- "Criminal Politics," The North American Review, Vol. 150, No. 403, Jun., 1890.
- "Money Interests in Political Affairs," The Forum, Vol. X, 1890.
- "A Key to Municipal Reform," The North American Review, Vol. 151, No. 407, Oct., 1890.
- "The Economic Man," The North American Review, Vol. 153, No. 419, Oct., 1891.
- "Idleness and Immorality," The Forum, Vol. XIII, 1892.
- "A Month of Quarantine," The North American Review, Vol. 155, No. 433, Dec., 1892.
- "The Duty of Educated Men in a Democracy," The Forum, Vol. XVII, 1894.
- "The Problems of Municipal Government," Annals of the American Academy of Political and Social Science, Vol. 4, May, 1894.
- "Who Will Pay the Bills of Socialism?," The Forum, Vol. XVII, 1894.
- "Diplomacy and the Newspaper," The North American Review, Vol. 160, No. 462, May, 1895.
- "The Political Situation," The Forum, Vol. XXI, May 1896.
- "The Absurdity of War," The Century Magazine, January 1897.
- "The Illiteracy of American Boys," Educational Review, Vol. XIII, January 1897.
- "Peculiarities of American Municipal Government," The Atlantic Monthly, Vol. 80, 1897.
- "The Conditions of Good Colonial Government," The Forum, Vol. XXVII, 1899.
- "Horrors of War — Fighting Instincts Hereditary," The Advocate of Peace (1894–1920), Vol. 62, No. 2, February 1900.
- "The Eclipse of Liberalism," The Nation, Vol. LXXI, 1900.
- "Burke." In: The Library of Oratory, Ancient and Modern. New York: Current Literature Pub. Co., 1902.

== See also ==
- Godkin Lectures
- Imperialism
- Irish question

== Sources ==
- Baynes, T. S.; Smith, W. R., eds. (1884). "New York" . Encyclopædia Britannica. Vol. 17 (9th ed.). New York: Charles Scribner's Sons.
- Wilson, J. G.; Fiske, J., eds. (1900). "Godkin, Edwin Lawrence" . Appletons' Cyclopædia of American Biography. New York: D. Appleton.
- Armstrong, William M. (1957). E.L. Godkin and American Foreign Policy, 1865-1900. New York: Bookman Associates.
- Armstrong, William M. (1978). E.L. Godkin: A Biography. Albany: State University of New York.
- Armstrong, William M., ed. (1974). The Gilded Age Letters of E.L. Godkin. Albany: State University of New York.
- Beito, David T. & Beito, Linda Royster. "Gold Democrats and the Decline of Classical Liberalism, 1896-1900," Independent Review, 4, pp. 555–75 (Spring 2000).
