= Godkin Lectures =

The Edwin L. Godkin Lecture is an annual lecture hosted by Harvard Kennedy School at Harvard University, Cambridge, Massachusetts, United States.

The lecture series was founded in 1903 and named in honor of Edwin L. Godkin, the Irish-American journalist who founded The Nation. When Lord Bryce delivered the first Godkin Lecture in 1903, Harvard president Charles William Eliot gave the introduction and said, "These lectures upon government and civic duty are in remembrance of a man who gave his life to the public through the medium of the press . . . Mr. Godkin was a man of remarkable vigor and great candor, and unremitting devotion to lofty ideals of public duty." The Godkin Lectures have been delivered by Lord Bryce, Heinrich Brüning, C. P. Snow, Edward Heath, Walter Heller, McGeorge Bundy, John M. Deutch, Walter Lippmann, Daniel Patrick Moynihan, Nelson Rockefeller, Paul Samuelson, Derek Bok, and Clark Kerr, among others.
