= Kreis Heilsberg =

District in Prussia

Heilsberg Kreis Heilsberg
- Landkreis
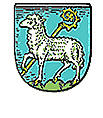
- Coat of arms
- Interactive map of Heilsberg
- Country: Prussia (1818-1871); German Empire (1871-1918); German Reich (1918-1945)
- Province: East Prussia
- Regierungsbezirk: Königsberg
- Established: 1818
- Dissolved: 1945
- Seat: Heilsberg

Population (1939)
  - Total: 55,057

Heilsberg was a district in East Prussia and existed as a Prussian-German district in the period from 1818 to 1945. Due to its affiliation with Warmia, the district had a majority Catholic population, and the Center Party won an absolute majority of votes in elections until 1933. From 1773 to 1818, there had already been a district of Heilsberg in Warmia, which covered a much larger area.

== History ==
The area of the district of Allenstein historically belonged to the prince-bishopric of Warmia, which fell to the Kingdom of Prussia in 1772 as part of the first Polish partition. After the incorporation into the Prussian state, the two districts of Braunsberg and Heilsberg were established in Warmia in 1773, both of which were assigned to the War and Domain Chamber of Königsberg. The county of Heilsberg at that time had an area of about 2500 km^{2} and included the old Warmian offices of Allenstein, Bischofsburg, Bischofstein, Heilsberg, Rößel, Seeburg as well as Wartenburg.

=== Composition and establishment ===
As part of the Prussian administrative reforms, the need arose for a comprehensive district reform throughout East Prussia, as the districts established in 1752 or 1773 had proven to be inappropriate and too large. In Warmia, a new district of Heilsberg was formed from the northern part of the old district of Heilsberg and the southern part of the old district of Braunsberg, effective February 1, 1818. It initially included the Catholic parishes of Arnsdorf, Benern, Elditten, Glottau, Guttstadt, Heiligenthal, Heilsberg, Kalckstein, Kiwitten, Krekollen, Peterswalde bei Guttstadt, Queetz, Reichenberg, Reimerswalde, Roggenhausen, Schlit, Siegfriedswalde, Stolzhagen, Wernegitten, Wolfsdorf, Wormditt and Wuslack. The seat of the district administration was the town of Heilsberg. On April 1, 1819, the district boundaries were changed once again. The parish of Frauendorf from the district of Braunsberg came to the district of Heilsberg and the parish of Wormditt moved from the district of Heilsberg to the district of Braunsberg.

The Kreis Heilsberg was assigned to the administrative district Königsberg.

=== German unification and modern times ===
In 1829 - after the merger of the former provinces of Prussia and West Prussia - the district belonged to the new province of Prussia with its seat in Königsberg. Since July 1, 1867 the district belonged to the North German Confederation and from January 1, 1871 to the German Empire. After the division of the province of Prussia into the new provinces of East Prussia and West Prussia, the district of Heilsberg became part of East Prussia on April 1, 1878. The district office, which had been located in Guttstadt for some time, was moved back to Heilsberg on October 1, 1896.

On September 30, 1929, in accordance with the development in the rest of Prussia, a territorial reform took place in the district of Heilsberg, in which almost all manor districts were dissolved and assigned to neighboring rural communities.

From January to March 1945, the Red Army conquered the district. In May 1945 it placed it under the administration of the Polish People's Republic. Subsequently, the established German population of the district was expelled from the district and, from 1946, systematically settled in their place Poles, 43.7 percent of whom were themselves displaced persons from eastern Poland.

In 1999, the present-day Powiat Lidzbarski (Heilsberg District) was established with modified boundaries.

== Population evolution ==
Year	Population	Source
1800	64.416	
1818	26.966	
1846	43.611	
1871	45.699	
1890	53.537	
1900	51.629	
1910	51.912	
1925	52.757	
1933	53.672	
1939	55.057	

== Politics ==
=== District council ===
- 1773–1804 Wilhelm Boguslaw von Gottberg
- 1804– Ludwig Constantin Sylvester von Creytz (min. till 1810)
- 1817–1836 von Conradi
- 1836–1839 N.N.
- 1839–1864 von Buddenbrock
- 1864–1894 Theodor von Saß (1833–1894)
- 1894–1910 Ernst von Schröter
- 1910–1915 Otto von Schlieben (1875–1932) (German conservative party)
- 1914–1916 von Seydlitz und Ludwigsdorf (temporary)
- 1916–1918 Herbert Rohde (1885–1975) (commissioner)
- 1918–1923 Karl Klamroth (1878–1976)
- 1923–1927 Friedrich Büttner (1886–1942)
- 1927–1928 Ernst Fischer (1896–1965) (commissioner)
- 1928–1937 Franz Hüppi (died in 1888)
- 1937–1943 Paul Hundrieser (1881–1972)
- 1943–1945 N.N.

=== Elections ===
In the German empire the district Heilsberg alongside the district Braunsberg would build the 6th Imperial election district of Königsberg. This Catholic dominated district would vote for a Center party candidate in every Reichstag election from 1871 to 1912.

== Municipalities ==
At the end of 1945 the district Heilsberg had 104 municipalities and 2 cities

Albrechtsdorf; Alt Garschen; Althof; Altkirch; Ankendorf; Arnsdorf; Battatron; Beiswalde; Benern; Bewernick; Blankenberg; Blankensee; Bleichenbarth; Blumenau; Bogen; Drewenz; Elditten; Eschenau; Frauendorf; Freimarkt; Friedrichsheide; Glottau	Gronau; Groß Klaussitten; Großendorf; Guttstadt; Heiligenfelde; Heiligenthal; Heilsberg, City; Hohenfeld; Jegothen; Kalkstein; Katzen; Kerschdorf; Kerschen; Kerwienen; Kiwitten; Kleiditten; Kleinenfeld; Klingerswalde; Klotainen; Knipstein; Knopen; Kobeln	Konitten; Konnegen; Krekollen; Langwiese; Launau; Lauterhagen; Lauterwalde; Lawden; Liewenberg; Lingenau; Markeim; Mawern; Medien; Münsterberg; Napratten; Neu Garschen; Neuendorf bei Guttstadt; Neuendorf bei Heilsberg; Noßberg; Ober Kapkeim; Petersdorf; Peterswalde	Polpen; Pomehren; Queetz; Raunau; Regerteln; Rehagen; Reichenberg; Reimerswalde; Retsch; Roggenhausen; Rosenbeck; Rosengarth; Schlitt; Schmolainen; Schönwalde; Schönwiese; Schulen; Schwenkitten; Schwuben; Settau; Siegfriedswalde; Sommerfeld	Soritten; Springborn; Stabunken; Sternberg; Stolzhagen; Süssenberg; Thegsten; Tollnigk; Trautenau; Unter Kapkeim; Voigtsdorf; Waltersmühl; Warlack; Wernegitten; Wolfsdorf; Workeim; Wosseden; Wuslack

== Notable people ==
- Georg Maximilian Cardinal Sterzinsky (* 9. Februar 1936 in Warlack, Kreis Heilsberg, East Prussia; † 30. July 2011 in Berlin) was a German Catholic Bishop and Cardinal
- Adolf August Poschmann (* 2. January 1885 in Neuendorf in Ermland; † 24. December 1977 in Münster) was a German researcher
- Dietrich Borm (* 13. October 1928 in Elditten, Kreis Heilsberg, East Prussian, today Ełdyty Wielkie, Polen; † 9. March 2018 in Hildesheim) was a German surgeon
- Bernhard Buchholz (* 19. August 1870 in Knopen, Landkreis Heilsberg, East Prussia; † 20. June 1954 in Amberg, Bavaria)
