= Drwęca Warmińska =

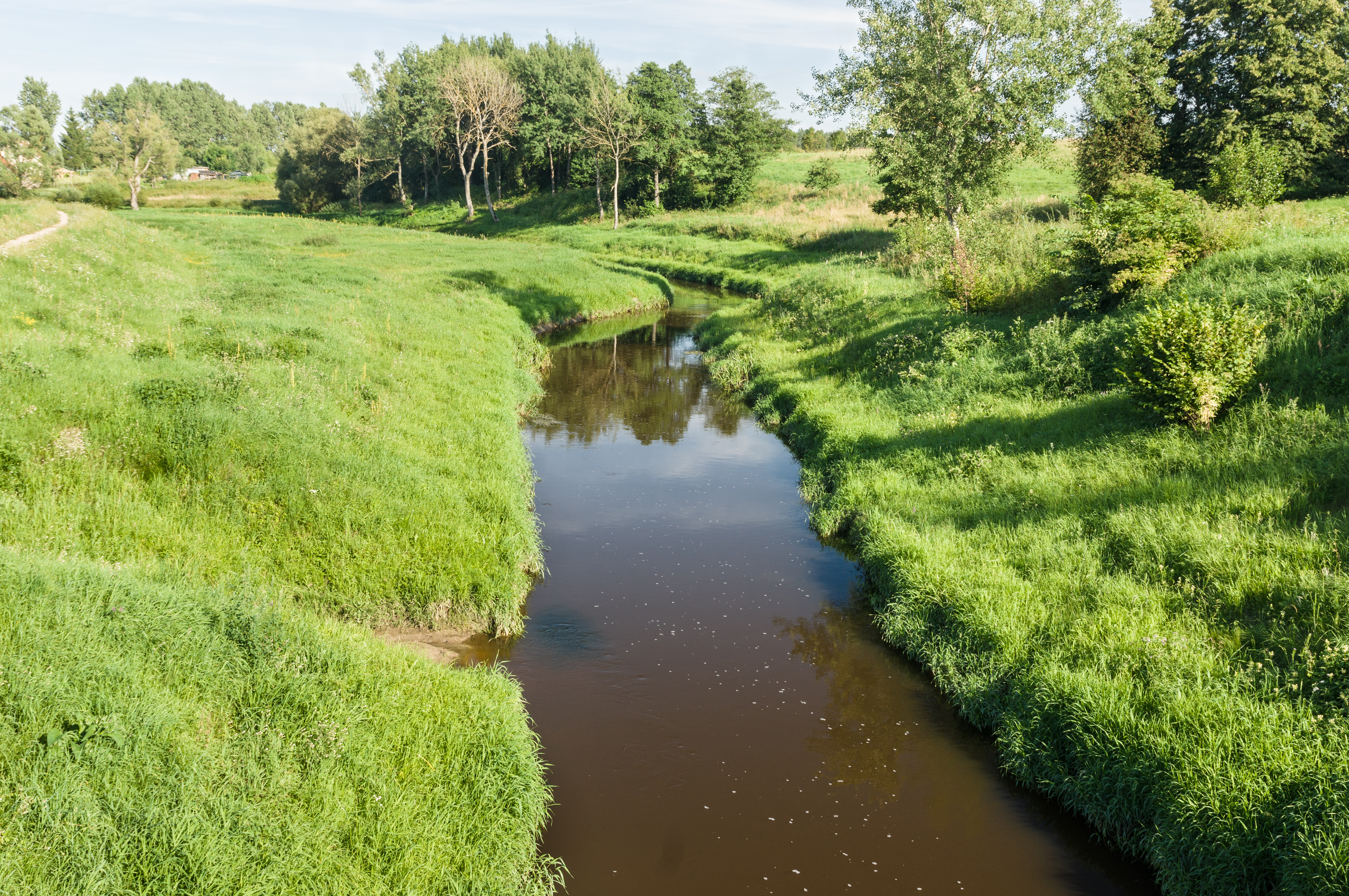

Location
- Country: Poland

Physical characteristics
- Source
  - location: Pasłęka
- Mouth
  - location: Bogatyńskie
  - coordinates: 54°05′50″N 20°02′37″E
- Length: 53,4 km

Drwęca Warmińska — a river in the Warmian-Masurian province, the right tributary of the Pasłęka River. Most of the river's course is located in Warmia. The town of Orneta is located on the river.

In historical sources, the river appeared under the names: Drewenz (1926), Dribentz (1595), Drywantze (1287), Drawant, Drewant (1282), Drywanz (1261). The name Drwęca Warmińska was officially introduced in 1949, replacing the previous German name, Drewenz. The nickname Warmian distinguishes it from the Drwęca, a tributary of the Vistula River.

The river flows through the Old Prussian Plain and the Warmian Plain. The sources, in the form of small streams, are located in the Górowskie Hills, at an altitude of 125 meters above sea level, near the village of Glądy in the municipality of Górowo Iławeckie. The length of the river is 53.4 kilometers, and the basin area is 327.7 km^{2}. In its middle course it flows through a forested valley, strongly meandering, through the Orneta Plain. It flows into the Pasleka River at its 70.1 kilometer, about 8 kilometers below Orneta, near the villages of Drwęczno and Bogatyńskie.

On the Drwęca Warmińska River lie the villages of: Stabunity, Drwęca, Zaręby, Runowo, Bugi, Krasny Bór, Kaszuny, Mingajny, Bludyny, Krosno, Orneta, Drwęczno.

The basin of the Drwęca Warmińska River is characterized by an extensive river system, with a significant predominance of left-bank tributaries. The largest of these include: Ramya, Szeląg, Lubomińska Struga and Mingajny (Mingajska Struga).

The catchment area of the Drwęca Warmińska is made up of glacial till in the northern part of the basin and sand in the southern part of the basin. Small moraine hills occur in the eastern part of the basin. The catchment from the Orneta water gauge (7.8 km) to the mouth of the Pasleka River is located on outwash plain. Only at the mouth of the Drwęca River to the Pasleka River are clays present. The river has a deeply incised valley in this area (25–30 m).

The river is available for canoe tourism and fishing.

Before 1714, at the level of the village of Krosno, the bed of the Drwęca Warmińska River was moved in order to erect the main altar of a newly built temple in the place where an alabaster statue of the Mother of God had been found lying in the river many years earlier.

In 2015–2016, a site of brook lamprey (which is under strict protection) was observed in the river at the height of the Bludyny settlement.
