= Łaniewo =

Łaniewo may refer to:

- Łaniewo, West Pomeranian Voivodeship
- Łaniewo, Warmian-Masurian Voivodeship
- Łaniewo-Leśniczówka, Warmian-Masurian Voivodeship
