= Lejławki =

Lejławki may refer to the following places in Poland:

- Lejławki Małe
- Lejławki Wielkie
