= Grabniak, Warmian-Masurian Voivodeship =

Grabniak
- Settlement
- Location within Poland
- Coordinates: 54°10′N 20°19′E
- Country: Poland
- Voivodeship: Warmian-Masurian
- County: Lidzbark
- Gmina: Lidzbark Warmiński

Grabniak [ˈɡrabɲak] is a settlement in the administrative district of Gmina Lidzbark Warmiński, within Lidzbark County, Warmian-Masurian Voivodeship, in northern Poland.
