= Opin =

- Village
- Location within Poland
- Coordinates: 54°6′48″N 20°12′26″E
- Country: Poland
- Voivodeship: Warmian-Masurian
- County: Lidzbark
- Gmina: Orneta

Opin [ˈɔpin] (German: Open) is a village in the administrative district of Gmina Orneta, within Lidzbark County, Warmian-Masurian Voivodeship, in northern Poland.
