= Henrykowo, Lidzbark County =

Henrykowo
- Village
- Location within Poland
- Coordinates: 54°11′N 20°10′E
- Country: Poland
- Voivodeship: Warmian-Masurian
- County: Lidzbark
- Gmina: Orneta

Henrykowo [xɛnrɨˈkɔvɔ] (German: Heinrikau) is a village in the administrative district of Gmina Orneta, within Lidzbark County, Warmian-Masurian Voivodeship, in northern Poland.
