= Gajlity =

- Village
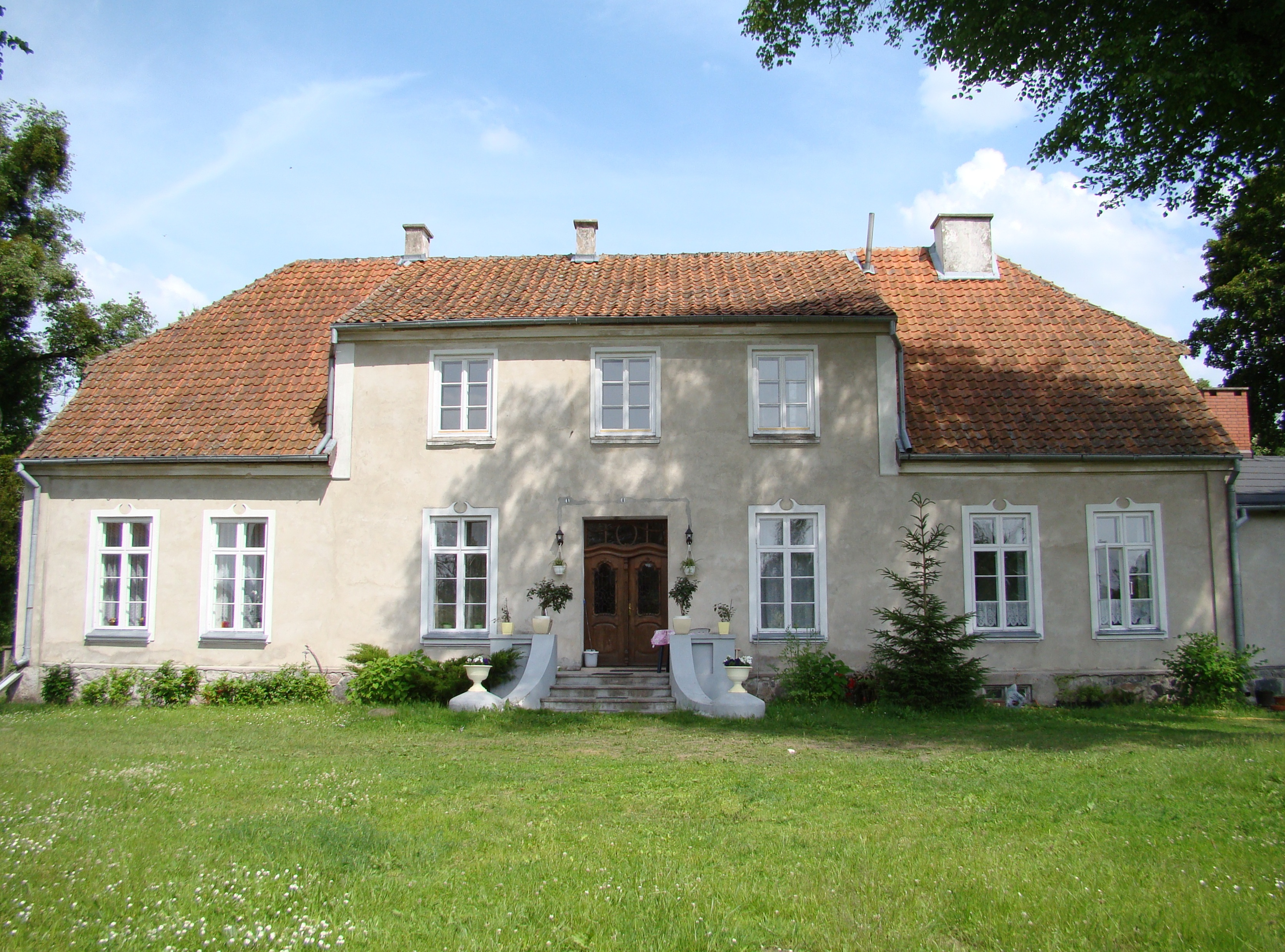

- Location within Poland
- Coordinates: 54°00′34″N 20°34′38″E
- Country: Poland
- Voivodeship: Warmian-Masurian
- County: Lidzbark
- Gmina: Lidzbark Warmiński

Gajlity [ɡai̯ˈlitɨ] is a village in the administrative district of Gmina Lidzbark Warmiński, within Lidzbark County, Warmian-Masurian Voivodeship, in northern Poland.
