= Osetnik, Warmian-Masurian Voivodeship =

Osetnik
- Village
- Location within Poland
- Coordinates: 54°11′N 19°58′E
- Country: Poland
- Voivodeship: Warmian-Masurian
- County: Lidzbark
- Gmina: Orneta

Osetnik [ɔˈsɛtnik] is a village in the administrative district of Gmina Orneta, within Lidzbark County, Warmian-Masurian Voivodeship, in northern Poland.
