= Wojciechowo, Warmian-Masurian Voivodeship =

Wojciechowo
- Village
- Location within Poland
- Coordinates: 54°5′N 20°9′E
- Country: Poland
- Voivodeship: Warmian-Masurian
- County: Lidzbark
- Gmina: Orneta

Wojciechowo (Polish: [vɔjt͡ɕɛˈxɔvɔ]) is a village in the administrative district of Gmina Orneta, within Lidzbark County, Warmian-Masurian Voivodeship, in northern Poland.

Before 1772 the area was part of Kingdom of Poland, and in 1772–1945 it belonged to Prussia and Germany (East Prussia).
