= Marków, Warmian-Masurian Voivodeship =

Marków
- Settlement
- Location within Poland
- Coordinates: 54°08′21″N 20°36′50″E
- Country: Poland
- Voivodeship: Warmian-Masurian
- County: Lidzbark
- Gmina: Lidzbark Warmiński

Marków [ˈmarkuf] is a settlement in the administrative district of Gmina Lidzbark Warmiński, within Lidzbark County, Warmian-Masurian Voivodeship, in northern Poland.
