= Karbowo, Warmian-Masurian Voivodeship =

Karbowo
- Village
- Location within Poland
- Coordinates: 54°5′N 20°11′E
- Country: Poland
- Voivodeship: Warmian-Masurian
- County: Lidzbark
- Gmina: Orneta

Karbowo [karˈbɔvɔ] is a village located in the administrative district of Gmina Orneta, within Lidzbark County, Warmian-Masurian Voivodeship, in northern Poland. It is situated approximately 5 km (3 mi) south-east of Orneta, 27 km (17 mi) west of Lidzbark Warmiński, and 40 km (25 mi) north-west of the regional capital, Olsztyn.
