= Karbówka =

- Village
- Location within Poland
- Coordinates: 54°4′6″N 20°11′0″E
- Country: Poland
- Voivodeship: Warmian-Masurian
- County: Lidzbark
- Gmina: Lubomino

Karbówka [karˈbufka] is a village in the administrative district of Gmina Lubomino, within Lidzbark County, Warmian-Masurian Voivodeship, in northern Poland.

Before 1772 the area was part of Kingdom of Poland, and then from 1772 to 1945, Prussia and Germany (East Prussia).
