= Biała Wola =

- Village
- Location within Poland
- Coordinates: 54°2′18″N 20°12′18″E
- Country: Poland
- Voivodeship: Warmian-Masurian
- County: Lidzbark
- Gmina: Lubomino
- Population: 160

Biała Wola [ˈbjawa ˈvɔla] is a village in the administrative district of Gmina Lubomino, within Lidzbark County, Warmian-Masurian Voivodeship, in northern Poland.

Before 1772 the area was part of the Kingdom of Poland, and in 1772–1945 it belonged to Prussia and Germany (East Prussia).
