= Łabno =

- Village
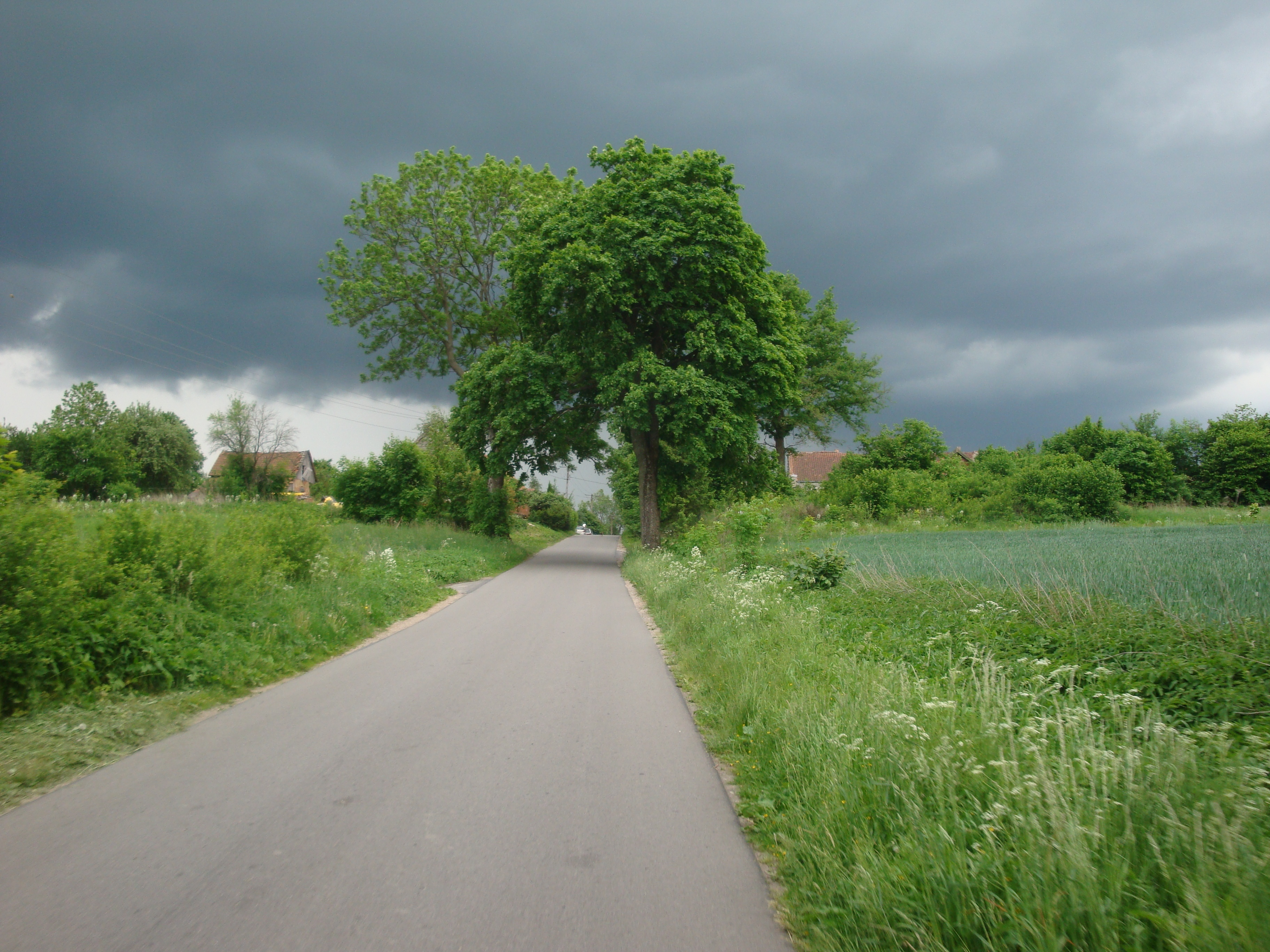

- Location within Poland
- Coordinates: 54°06′10″N 20°34′49″E
- Country: Poland
- Voivodeship: Warmian-Masurian
- County: Lidzbark
- Gmina: Lidzbark Warmiński

Łabno [ˈwabnɔ] is a village in the administrative district of Gmina Lidzbark Warmiński, within Lidzbark County, Warmian-Masurian Voivodeship, in northern Poland.
