= Zwierzyniec, Lidzbark County =

Zwierzyniec
- Village
- Location within Poland
- Coordinates: 54°06′58″N 20°25′28″E
- Country: Poland
- Voivodeship: Warmian-Masurian
- County: Lidzbark
- Gmina: Lidzbark Warmiński

Zwierzyniec (Polish: [zvjɛˈʐɨɲɛt͡s]) is a village in the administrative district of Gmina Lidzbark Warmiński, within Lidzbark County, Warmian-Masurian Voivodeship, in northern Poland.
