= Redy-Osada =

- Village
- Location within Poland
- Coordinates: 54°09′01″N 20°31′58″E
- Country: Poland
- Voivodeship: Warmian-Masurian
- County: Lidzbark
- Gmina: Lidzbark Warmiński

Redy-Osada [ˈrɛdɨ ɔˈsada] is a village in the administrative district of Gmina Lidzbark Warmiński, within Lidzbark County, Warmian-Masurian Voivodeship, in northern Poland.
