= Wola Lipecka =

- Village
- Location within Poland
- Coordinates: 54°10′40″N 20°12′46″E
- Country: Poland
- Voivodeship: Warmian-Masurian
- County: Lidzbark
- Gmina: Orneta
- Population: 100

Wola Lipecka [ˈvɔla liˈpɛt͡ska] is a village in the administrative district of Gmina Orneta, within Lidzbark County, Warmian-Masurian Voivodeship, in northern Poland.
