= Tremlak =

- Settlement
- Location within Poland
- Coordinates: 54°01′13″N 20°34′12″E
- Country: Poland
- Voivodeship: Warmian-Masurian
- County: Lidzbark
- Gmina: Lidzbark Warmiński

Tremlak [ˈtrɛmlak] is a settlement in the administrative district of Gmina Lidzbark Warmiński, within Lidzbark County, Warmian-Masurian Voivodeship, in northern Poland.
