= Chełm, Warmian-Masurian Voivodeship =

Chełm
- Village
- Location within Poland
- Coordinates: 54°4′N 20°32′E
- Country: Poland
- Voivodeship: Warmian-Masurian
- County: Lidzbark
- Gmina: Lidzbark Warmiński
- Time zone: UTC+1 (CET)
  - Summer (DST): UTC+2 (CEST)
- Vehicle registration: NLI

Chełm (Polish pronunciation: [xɛwm]) is a village in the administrative district of Gmina Lidzbark Warmiński, within Lidzbark County, Warmian-Masurian Voivodeship, in northern Poland. It is located in the historic region of Warmia.
