= Świękity =

- Village
- Location within Poland
- Coordinates: 54°01′20″N 20°10′09″E
- Country: Poland
- Voivodeship: Warmian-Masurian
- County: Lidzbark
- Gmina: Lubomino

Świękity (Polish: [ɕfjɛŋˈkʲitɨ]) is a village in the administrative district of Gmina Lubomino, within Lidzbark County, Warmian-Masurian Voivodeship, in northern Poland. It is located 2 kilometers north of Ełdyty Wielkie.
