= Pilnik =

Pilnik can refer to:

- Hermann Pilnik
- Pilnik, Warmian-Masurian Voivodeship
- Pilnik, Mrągowo County
