= Morawa, Warmian-Masurian Voivodeship =

Morawa
- Village
- Location within Poland
- Coordinates: 54°10′44″N 20°40′53″E
- Country: Poland
- Voivodeship: Warmian-Masurian
- County: Lidzbark
- Gmina: Lidzbark Warmiński

Morawa [mɔˈrava] (German Maraunen) is a village in the administrative district of Gmina Lidzbark Warmiński, within Lidzbark County, Warmian-Masurian Voivodeship, in northern Poland.
