= Pilnik, Warmian-Masurian Voivodeship =

Pilnik
- Village
- Location within Poland
- Coordinates: 54°07′17″N 20°33′26″E
- Country: Poland
- Voivodeship: Warmian-Masurian
- County: Lidzbark
- Gmina: Lidzbark Warmiński

Pilnik [ˈpilnik] is a village in the administrative district of Gmina Lidzbark Warmiński, within Lidzbark County, Warmian-Masurian Voivodeship, in northern Poland.
