= Kraszewo, Lidzbark County =

Kraszewo
- Village
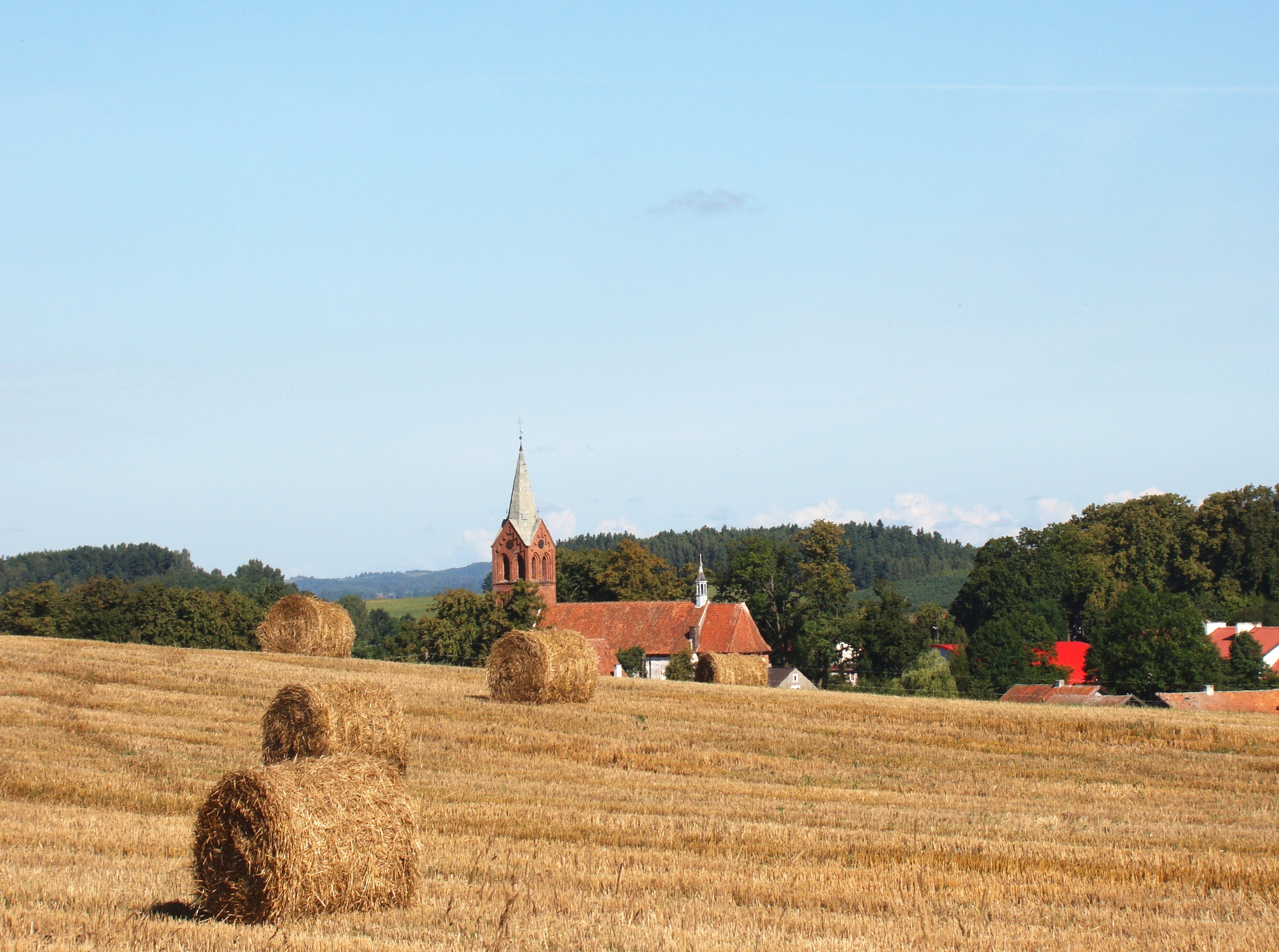
- View of Kraszewo with the Saint Elisabeth church

- Location within Poland
- Coordinates: 54°5′N 20°33′E
- Country: Poland
- Voivodeship: Warmian-Masurian
- County: Lidzbark
- Gmina: Lidzbark Warmiński
- Time zone: UTC+1 (CET)
  - Summer (DST): UTC+2 (CEST)
- Vehicle registration: NLI

Kraszewo (Polish pronunciation: [kraˈʂɛvɔ]) is a village in the administrative district of Gmina Lidzbark Warmiński, within Lidzbark County, Warmian-Masurian Voivodeship, in northern Poland.
