= Łaniewo-Leśnictwo =

- Village
- Location within Poland
- Coordinates: 54°06′34″N 20°25′21″E
- Country: Poland
- Voivodeship: Warmian-Masurian
- County: Lidzbark
- Gmina: Lidzbark Warmiński

Łaniewo-Leśnictwo (Polish pronunciation: [waˈɲɛvɔ lɛɕˈɲit͡stfɔ]) is a village in the administrative district of Gmina Lidzbark Warmiński, within Lidzbark County, Warmian-Masurian Voivodeship, in northern Poland.
