= Mingajny =

- Village
- Location within Poland
- Coordinates: 54°10′N 20°15′E
- Country: Poland
- Voivodeship: Warmian-Masurian
- County: Lidzbark
- Gmina: Orneta

Mingajny [minˈɡai̯nɨ] is a village in the administrative district of Gmina Orneta, within Lidzbark County, Warmian-Masurian Voivodeship, in northern Poland.
