= Brzydowo, Olsztyn County =

Brzydowo
- Village
- Location within Poland
- Coordinates: 53°54′41″N 20°8′4″E
- Country: Poland
- Voivodeship: Warmian-Masurian
- County: Olsztyn
- Gmina: Świątki
- Population: 442

Brzydowo [bʐɨˈdɔvɔ] is a village in the administrative district of Gmina Świątki, within Olsztyn County, Warmian-Masurian Voivodeship, in northern Poland.
