= Krasny Bór =

- Settlement
- Location within Poland
- Coordinates: 54°08′54″N 20°21′30″E
- Country: Poland
- Voivodeship: Warmian-Masurian
- County: Lidzbark
- Gmina: Lidzbark Warmiński

Krasny Bór (Polish: [ˈkrasnɨ ˈbur]) is a settlement in the administrative district of Gmina Lidzbark Warmiński, within Lidzbark County, Warmian-Masurian Voivodeship, in northern Poland.
