= Nowa Wieś Wielka, Lidzbark County =

Nowa Wieś Wielka
- Village
- Location within Poland
- Coordinates: 54°10′52″N 20°30′29″E
- Country: Poland
- Voivodeship: Warmian-Masurian
- County: Lidzbark
- Gmina: Lidzbark Warmiński

Nowa Wieś Wielka [ˈnɔva ˈvjɛɕ ˈvjɛlka] is a village in the administrative district of Gmina Lidzbark Warmiński, within Lidzbark County, Warmian-Masurian Voivodeship, in northern Poland.
