= Gmina Świątki =

Gmina Świątki Świątki Commune
- Gmina
- Interactive map of Gmina Świątki
- Coordinates (Świątki): 53°55′N 20°14′E
- Country: Poland
- Voivodeship: Warmian-Masurian
- County: Olsztyn County
- Seat: Świątki

Area
  - Total: 163.8 km^{2} (63.2 sq mi)

Population (2006)
  - Total: 4,234
  - Density: 25.85/km^{2} (66.95/sq mi)

Gmina Świątki is a rural gmina (administrative district) in Olsztyn County, Warmian-Masurian Voivodeship, in northern Poland. Its seat is the village of Świątki, which lies approximately 23 kilometres (14 mi) north-west of the regional capital Olsztyn.

The gmina covers an area of 163.8 square kilometres (63.2 sq mi), and as of 2006 its total population is 4,234.

== Villages ==
Gmina Świątki contains the villages and settlements of Brzeźno, Brzydowo, Dąbrówka, Drzazgi, Garzewo, Gołogóra, Jankowo, Kalisty, Kiewry, Kłobia, Klony, Komalwy, Konradowo, Kwiecewo, Łumpia, Różynka, Skolity, Świątki, Włodowo, Worławki and Żardeniki.

== Neighbouring gminas ==
Gmina Świątki is bordered by the gminas of Dobre Miasto, Dywity, Jonkowo, Lubomino, Łukta, Miłakowo and Morąg.
