= Wapnik =

- Village
- Location within Poland
- Coordinates: 54°4′N 20°10′E
- Country: Poland
- Voivodeship: Warmian-Masurian
- County: Lidzbark
- Gmina: Lubomino

Wapnik [ˈvapnik] is a village in the administrative district of Gmina Lubomino, within Lidzbark County, Warmian-Masurian Voivodeship, in northern Poland.
