= Wójtowo, Lidzbark County =

Wójtowo
- Village
- Location within Poland
- Coordinates: 54°4′N 20°12′E
- Country: Poland
- Voivodeship: Warmian-Masurian
- County: Lidzbark
- Gmina: Lubomino

Wójtowo [vui̯ˈtɔvɔ] is a village in the administrative district of Gmina Lubomino, within Lidzbark County, Warmian-Masurian Voivodeship, in northern Poland.

Before 1772 the area was part of Kingdom of Poland, and in 1772–1945 it belonged to Prussia and Germany (East Prussia).
