= Bogatyńskie =

- Village
- Location within Poland
- Coordinates: 54°6′N 20°5′E
- Country: Poland
- Voivodeship: Warmian-Masurian
- County: Lidzbark
- Gmina: Orneta

Bogatyńskie [bɔɡaˈtɨɲskʲɛ] is a village in the administrative district of Gmina Orneta, within Lidzbark County, Warmian-Masurian Voivodeship, in northern Poland.

The Old Prussian family of Nicolaus von Tüngen (or Tungen), bishop of Warmia from 1467 until 1489, originates from this village. In 1347, ancestors of von Tüngen, the Prussian Fürstbischof vom Ermland (Prince-Bishop of Warmia), the brothers Gunthe, Namir, Warpune and Sander were recorded.
