= Zaręby, Warmian-Masurian Voivodeship =

Zaręby
- Village
- Location within Poland
- Coordinates: 54°10′56″N 20°24′33″E
- Country: Poland
- Voivodeship: Warmian-Masurian
- County: Lidzbark
- Gmina: Lidzbark Warmiński

Zaręby [zaˈrɛmbɨ] is a village in the administrative district of Gmina Lidzbark Warmiński, within Lidzbark County, Warmian-Masurian Voivodeship, in northern Poland.
