= Dąbrówka, Olsztyn County =

Dąbrówka
- Village
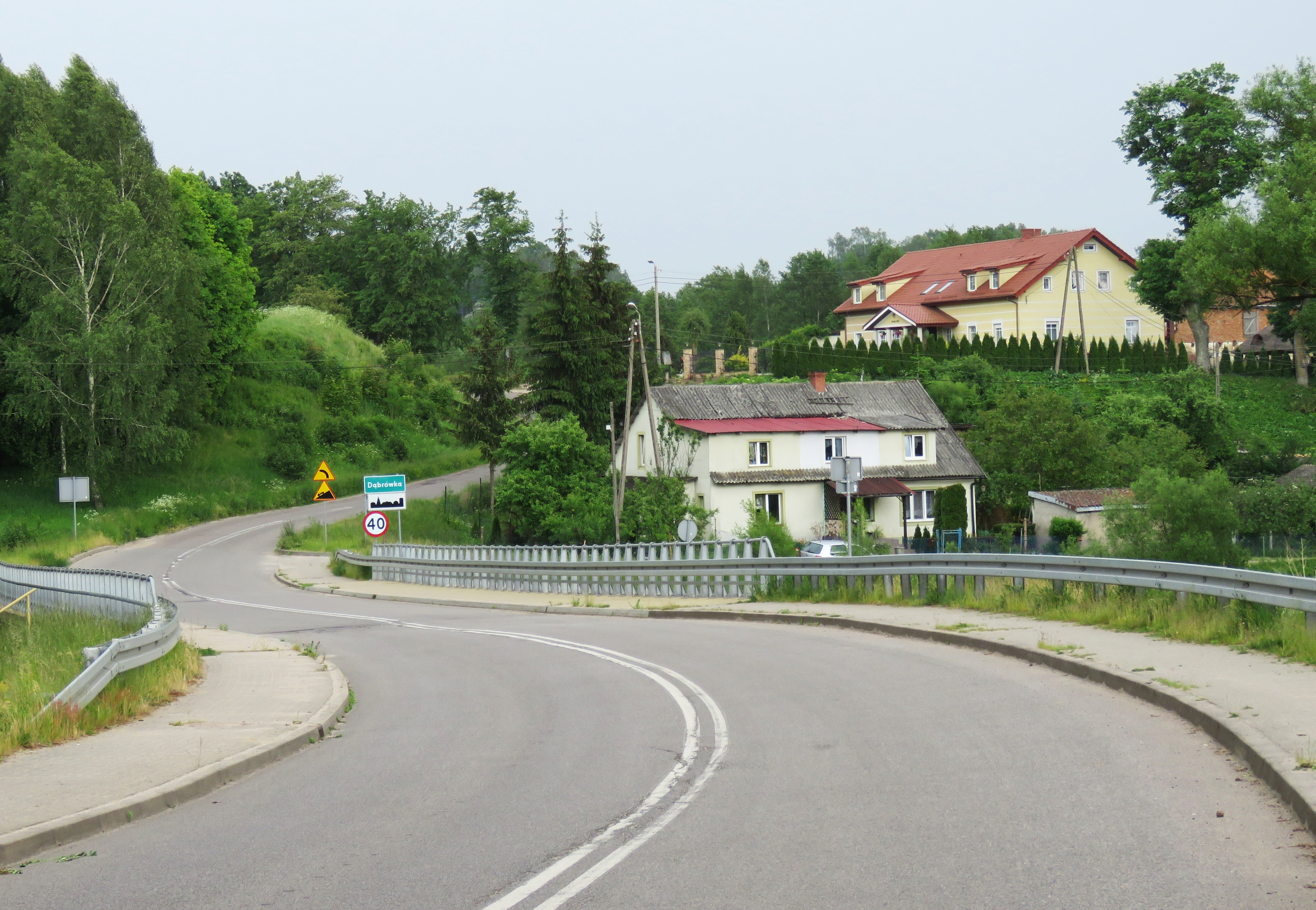
- Houses in Dąbrówka, Olsztyn county

- Location within Poland
- Coordinates: 53°55′06″N 20°11′51″E
- Country: Poland
- Voivodeship: Warmian-Masurian
- County: Olsztyn
- Gmina: Świątki

Dąbrówka [dɔmˈbrufka] is a village in the administrative district of Gmina Świątki, within Olsztyn County, Warmian-Masurian Voivodeship, in northern Poland.

Before 1772 the area was part of Kingdom of Poland, and in 1772–1945 it belonged to Prussia and Germany (East Prussia).
