= Miłogórze =

- Village
- Location within Poland
- Coordinates: 54°4′N 20°31′E
- Country: Poland
- Voivodeship: Warmian-Masurian
- County: Lidzbark
- Gmina: Lidzbark Warmiński

Miłogórze [miwɔˈɡuʐɛ] is a village in the administrative district of Gmina Lidzbark Warmiński, within Lidzbark County, Warmian-Masurian Voivodeship, in northern Poland.

Its archaic name is 'Liewenberg' a Swedish and German reference to the Lieven family, which traces back its origin to the Scandinavian settlement of Kaup, in modern-day Kaliningrad Oblast.
