= Markajmy =

- Village
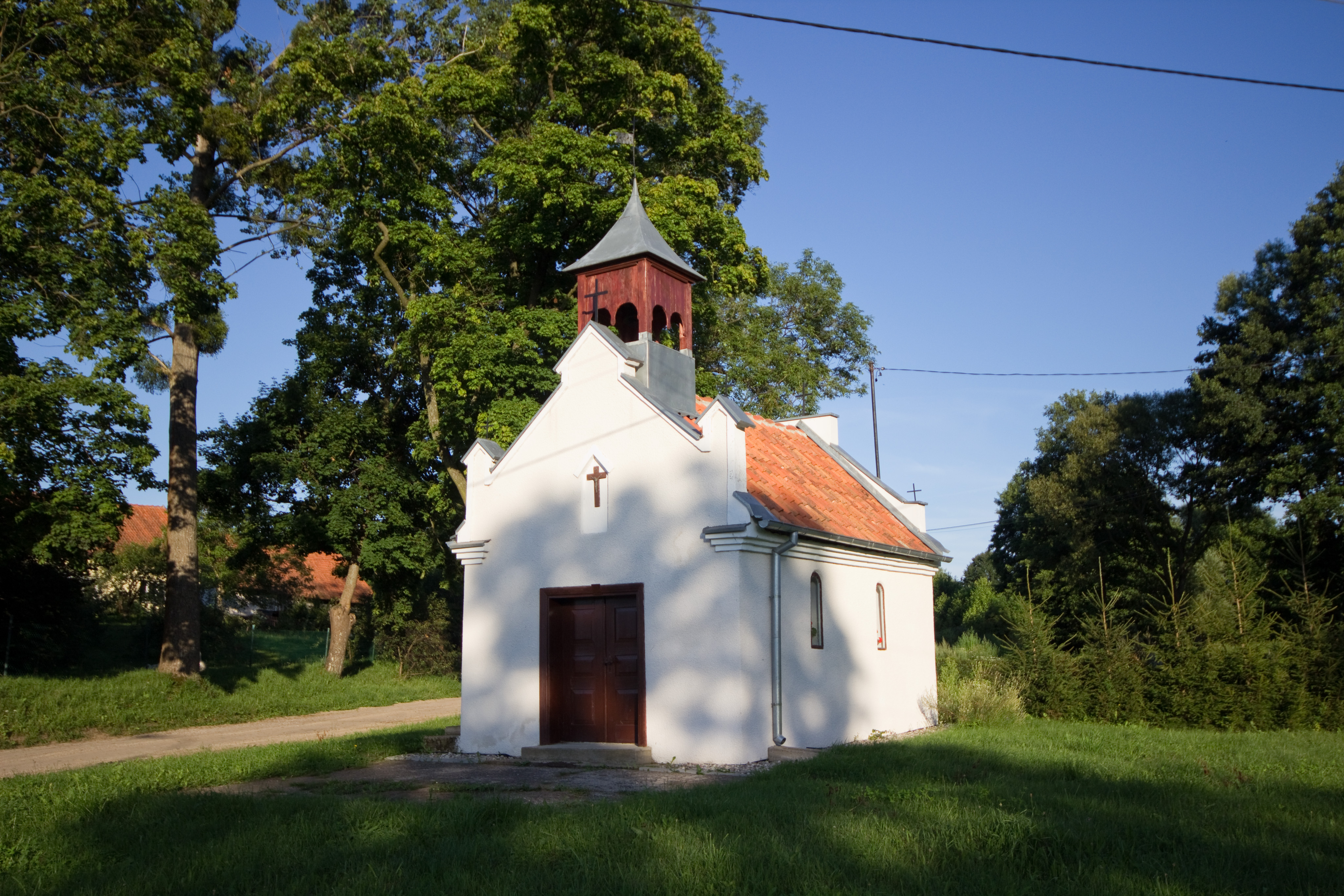
- Chapel in Markajmy

- Location within Poland
- Coordinates: 54°9′N 20°38′E
- Country: Poland
- Voivodeship: Warmian-Masurian
- County: Lidzbark
- Gmina: Lidzbark Warmiński

Population (approx.)
  - Total: 200
- Time zone: UTC+1 (CET)
  - Summer (DST): UTC+2 (CEST)
- Postal code: 11-100
- Vehicle registration: NLI

Markajmy [marˈkai̯mɨ] is a village in the administrative district of Gmina Lidzbark Warmiński, within Lidzbark County, Warmian-Masurian Voivodeship, in northern Poland. It is located in the historic region of Warmia.

There is a small cemetery of the Commonwealth War Graves Commission in Markajmy at which British and Commonwealth prisoners-of-war of Germany from World War I are buried.
