= Kłobia, Warmian-Masurian Voivodeship =

Kłobia
- Village
- Location within Poland
- Coordinates: 53°54′12″N 20°10′21″E
- Country: Poland
- Voivodeship: Warmian-Masurian
- County: Olsztyn
- Gmina: Świątki
- Population: 55

Kłobia [ˈkwɔbja] is a village in the administrative district of Gmina Świątki, within Olsztyn County, Warmian-Masurian Voivodeship, in northern Poland.
