= Kalisty =

- Village
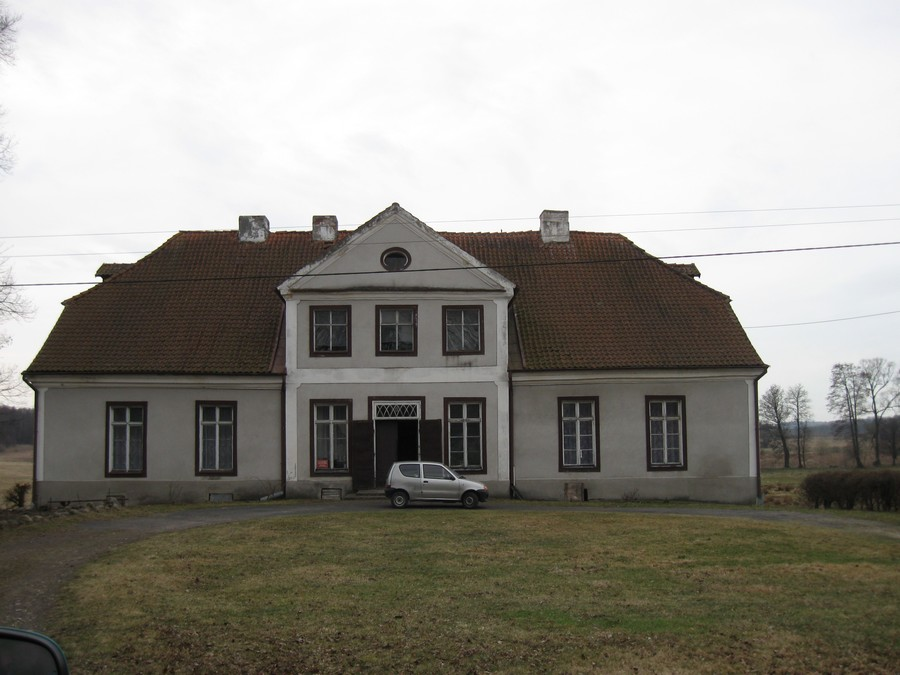
- Manor in Kalisty

- Location within Poland
- Coordinates: 53°55′07″N 20°11′46″E
- Country: Poland
- Voivodeship: Warmian-Masurian
- County: Olsztyn
- Gmina: Świątki

Kalisty (Polish pronunciation: [kaˈlistɨ]) is a village in the administrative district of Gmina Świątki, within Olsztyn County, Warmian-Masurian Voivodeship, in northern Poland.
