= Piotrowo, Warmian-Masurian Voivodeship =

Piotrowo
- Village
- Location within Poland
- Coordinates: 54°2′N 20°15′E
- Country: Poland
- Voivodeship: Warmian-Masurian
- County: Lidzbark
- Gmina: Lubomino

Piotrowo [pjɔˈtrɔvɔ] is a village in the administrative district of Gmina Lubomino, within Lidzbark County, Warmian-Masurian Voivodeship, in northern Poland.

Before 1772 the area was part of Kingdom of Poland. From 1772 to 1945, it was part of Prussia and then East Prussia in Germany.
