= Lejławki Małe =

- Village
- Location within Poland
- Coordinates: 54°8′28″N 20°5′17″E
- Country: Poland
- Voivodeship: Warmian-Masurian
- County: Lidzbark
- Gmina: Orneta

Lejławki Małe [lɛi̯ˈwafki ˈmawɛ] is a village in the administrative district of Gmina Orneta, within Lidzbark County, Warmian-Masurian Voivodeship, in northern Poland.

Before 1772 the area was part of Kingdom of Poland, and in 1772–1945 it belonged to Prussia and Germany (East Prussia).
