= Gmina Lubomino =

Gmina Lubomino Lubomino Commune
- Gmina
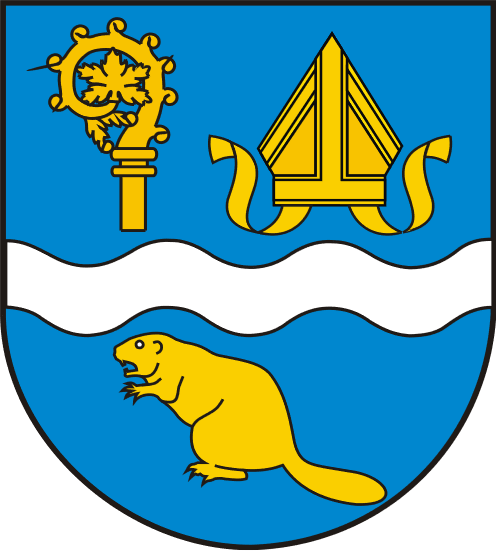
- Coat of arms
- Interactive map of Gmina Lubomino
- Coordinates (Lubomino): 54°4′0″N 20°14′25″E
- Country: Poland
- Voivodeship: Warmian-Masurian
- County: Lidzbark
- Seat: Lubomino

Area
  - Total: 149.56 km^{2} (57.75 sq mi)

Population (2006)
  - Total: 3,717
  - Density: 24.85/km^{2} (64.37/sq mi)
- Website: http://www.lubomino.ug.gov.pl

Gmina Lubomino is a rural gmina (administrative district) in Lidzbark County, Warmian-Masurian Voivodeship, in northern Poland. Its seat is the village of Lubomino, which lies approximately 24 kilometres (15 mi) west of Lidzbark Warmiński and 36 km (22 mi) north-west of the regional capital Olsztyn.

The gmina covers an area of 149.56 square kilometres (57.7 sq mi), and as of 2006 its total population is 3,717.

== Villages ==
Gmina Lubomino contains the villages and settlements of Biała Wola, Bieniewo, Ełdyty Małe, Ełdyty Wielkie, Gronowo, Karbówka, Lubomino, Piotrowo, Rogiedle, Różyn, Samborek, Świękity, Wapnik, Wilczkowo, Wójtowo, Wolnica, Zagony and Zajączki.

== Neighbouring gminas ==
Gmina Lubomino is bordered by the gminas of Dobre Miasto, Lidzbark Warmiński, Miłakowo, Orneta and Świątki.
