= Pomorowo =

- Village
- Location within Poland
- Coordinates: 54°6′N 20°29′E
- Country: Poland
- Voivodeship: Warmian-Masurian
- County: Lidzbark
- Gmina: Lidzbark Warmiński

Pomorowo [pɔmɔˈrɔvɔ] is a village in the administrative district of Gmina Lidzbark Warmiński, within Lidzbark County, Warmian-Masurian Voivodeship, in northern Poland.
