= Wilczkowo, Warmian-Masurian Voivodeship =

Wilczkowo
- Village
- Location within Poland
- Coordinates: 54°00′05″N 20°14′25″E
- Country: Poland
- Voivodeship: Warmian-Masurian
- County: Lidzbark
- Gmina: Lubomino

Wilczkowo [vilt͡ʂˈkɔvɔ] is a village in the administrative district of Gmina Lubomino, within Lidzbark County, Warmian-Masurian Voivodeship, in northern Poland. It is located on Highway 593 about halfway between Dobre Miasto on the east and Miłakowo on the west. The village is located in the historical region of Warmia, which was part of the Polish-Lithuanian Commonwealth until the Partitions of Poland in the late 18th century.
