= Łumpia =

- Village
- Location within Poland
- Coordinates: 53°56′59″N 20°12′09″E
- Country: Poland
- Voivodeship: Warmian-Masurian
- County: Olsztyn
- Gmina: Świątki

Łumpia [ˈwumpja] (German Lomp) is a village in the administrative district of Gmina Świątki, within Olsztyn County, Warmian-Masurian Voivodeship, in northern Poland.
