= Gmina Orneta =

Gmina Orneta Orneta Commune
- Gmina
- Coat of arms

- Location within Poland
- Coordinates (Orneta): 54°6′46″N 20°7′54″E
- Country: Poland
- Voivodeship: Warmian-Masurian
- County: Lidzbark
- Seat: Orneta

Area
  - Total: 244.13 km^{2} (94.26 sq mi)

Population (2006)
  - Total: 12,701
  - Density: 52.026/km^{2} (134.75/sq mi)
  - Urban: 9,380
  - Rural: 3,321
- Website: http://www.umig.orneta.net/

Gmina Orneta is an urban-rural gmina (administrative district) in Lidzbark County, Warmian-Masurian Voivodeship, in northern Poland. Its seat is the town of Orneta, which lies approximately 30 kilometres (19 mi) west of Lidzbark Warmiński and 44 km (27 mi) north-west of the regional capital Olsztyn.

The gmina covers an area of 244.13 square kilometres (94.3 sq mi), and as of 2006 its total population was 12,701 with the population of Orneta amounting to 9,380, and the population of the rural part of the gmina at 3,321 persons.

== Villages ==
Apart from the town of Orneta, Gmina Orneta contains the villages and settlements of Augustyny, Bażyny, Biały Dwór, Bogatyńskie, Chwalęcin, Dąbrówka, Drwęczno, Gieduty, Henrykowo, Karbowo, Karkajmy, Klusajny, Krosno, Krzykały, Kumajny, Lejławki Małe, Lejławki Wielkie, Miłkowo, Mingajny, Nowy Dwór, Opin, Osetnik, Ostry Kamień, Wojciechowo and Wola Lipecka.

== Neighbouring gminas ==
Gmina Orneta is bordered by the gminas of Godkowo, Lidzbark Warmiński, Lubomino, Miłakowo, Pieniężno, Płoskinia and Wilczęta.
