= Gmina Lidzbark Warmiński =

Gmina Lidzbark Warmiński Lidzbark Warmiński Commune
- Gmina
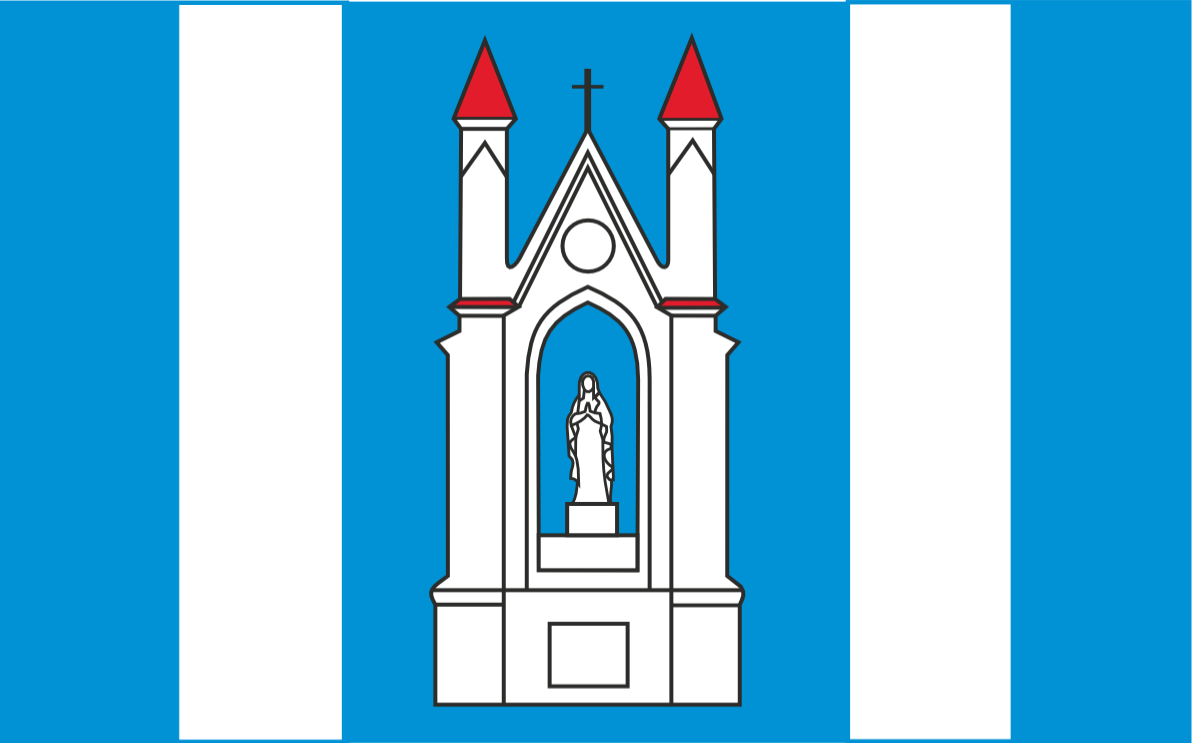
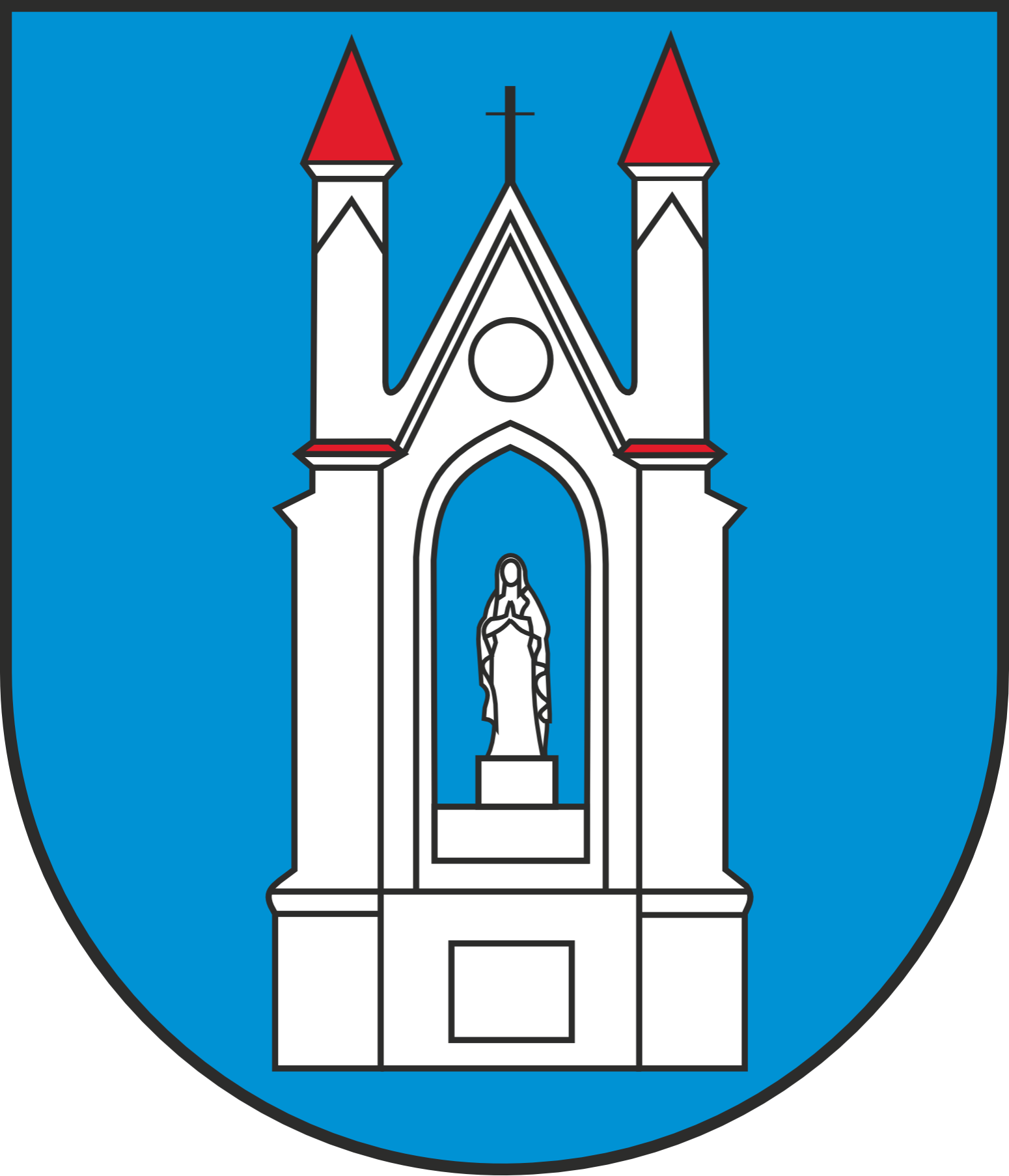
- Flag Coat of arms
- Interactive map of Gmina Lidzbark Warmiński
- Coordinates (Lidzbark Warmiński): 54°7′N 20°35′E
- Country: Poland
- Voivodeship: Warmian-Masurian
- County: Lidzbark
- Seat: Lidzbark Warmiński

Area
  - Total: 371.01 km^{2} (143.25 sq mi)

Population (2006)
  - Total: 6,733
  - Density: 18.15/km^{2} (47.00/sq mi)
- Website: http://www.gminalidzbark.com/

Gmina Lidzbark Warmiński is a rural gmina (administrative district) in Lidzbark County, Warmian-Masurian Voivodeship, in northern Poland. Its seat is the town of Lidzbark Warmiński, although the town is not part of the territory of the gmina.

The gmina covers an area of 371.01 square kilometres (143.2 sq mi), and as of 2006 its total population is 6,733.

== Villages ==
Gmina Lidzbark Warmiński contains the villages and settlements of Babiak, Blanki, Bobrownik, Budniki, Bugi, Chełm, Długołęka, Drwęca, Gajlity, Grabniak, Ignalin, Jagodów, Jagoty, Jarandowo, Kaszuny, Kierz, Kłębowo, Kłusity Wielkie, Knipy, Kochanówka, Koniewo, Koniewo-Osada, Kotowo, Krasny Bór, Kraszewo, Łabno, Łaniewo, Łaniewo-Leśniczówka, Lauda, Markajmy, Marków, Medyny, Miejska Wola, Miłogórze, Morawa, Nowa Wieś Wielka, Nowosady, Pilnik, Pomorowo, Redy, Redy-Osada, Rogóż, Runowo, Sarnowo, Stabunity, Stryjkowo, Suryty, Swajnie, Świętnik, Tremlak, Widryki, Wielochowo, Workiejmy, Wróblik, Zaręby, Zwierzyniec and Żytowo.

== Neighbouring gminas ==
Gmina Lidzbark Warmiński is bordered by the town of Lidzbark Warmiński and by the gminas of Bartoszyce, Dobre Miasto, Górowo Iławeckie, Jeziorany, Kiwity, Lubomino, Orneta and Pieniężno.
