= Bieniewo =

- Village
- Location within Poland
- Coordinates: 54°6′N 20°18′E
- Country: Poland
- Voivodeship: Warmian-Masurian
- County: Lidzbark
- Gmina: Lubomino

Bieniewo [bjɛˈɲɛvɔ] is a village in the administrative district of Gmina Lubomino, within Lidzbark County, Warmian-Masurian Voivodeship, in northern Poland.
