= Kiewry =

- Settlement
- Location within Poland
- Coordinates: 53°54′N 20°10′E
- Country: Poland
- Voivodeship: Warmian-Masurian
- County: Olsztyn
- Gmina: Świątki
- Population: 3

Kiewry [ˈkʲɛvrɨ] is a settlement in the administrative district of Gmina Świątki, within Olsztyn County, Warmian-Masurian Voivodeship, in northern Poland.
