= Skolity =

- Village
- Location within Poland
- Coordinates: 53°54′N 20°13′E
- Country: Poland
- Voivodeship: Warmian-Masurian
- County: Olsztyn
- Gmina: Świątki

Skolity [skɔˈlitɨ] (German Schlitt) is a village in the administrative district of Gmina Świątki, within Olsztyn County, Warmian-Masurian Voivodeship, in northern Poland.
