= Lubomino =

- Village
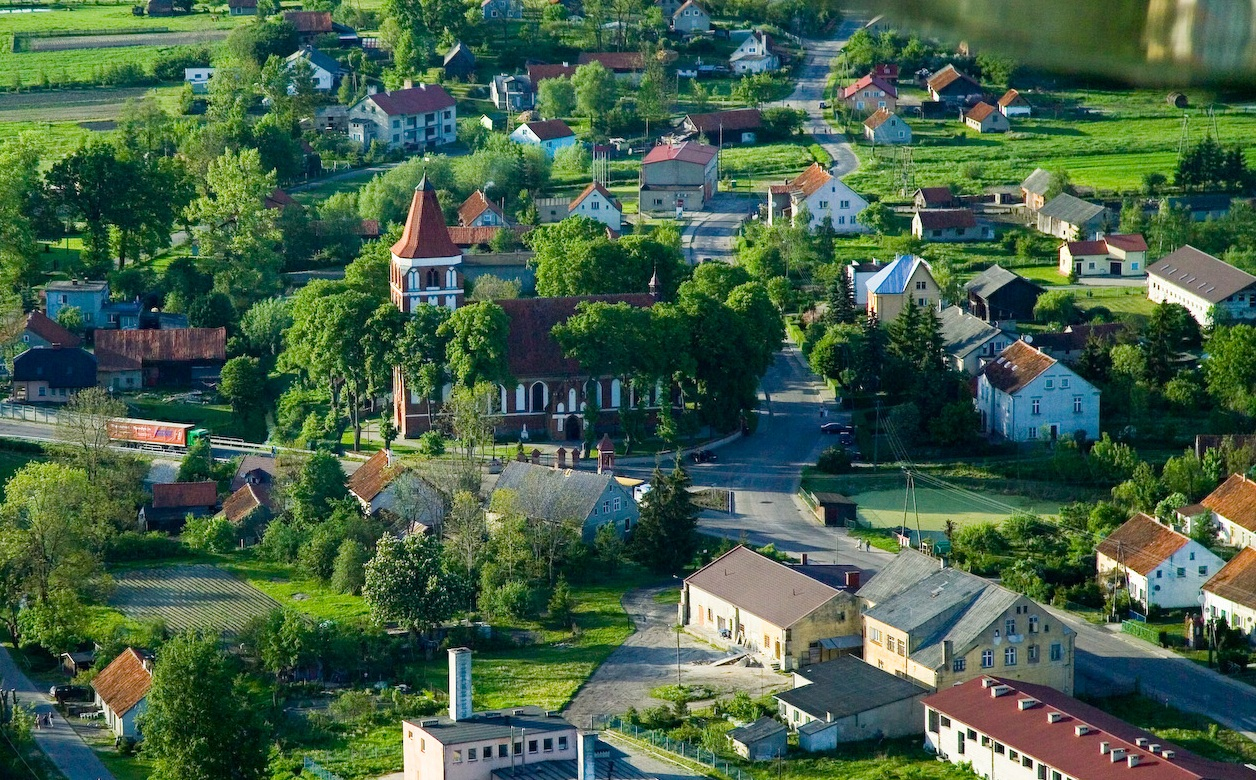

- Location within Poland
- Coordinates: 54°4′0″N 20°14′25″E
- Country: Poland
- Voivodeship: Warmian-Masurian
- County: Lidzbark
- Gmina: Lubomino
- Time zone: UTC+1 (CET)
  - Summer (DST): UTC+2 (CEST)
- Vehicle registration: NLI

Lubomino [lubɔˈminɔ] is a village in Lidzbark County, Warmian-Masurian Voivodeship, in northern Poland. It is the seat of the gmina (administrative district) called Gmina Lubomino.
