= Runowo, Warmian-Masurian Voivodeship =

Runowo
- Village
- Location within Poland
- Coordinates: 54°9′N 20°26′E
- Country: Poland
- Voivodeship: Warmian-Masurian
- County: Lidzbark
- Gmina: Lidzbark Warmiński
- Population: 1,010

Runowo [ruˈnɔvɔ] is a village in the administrative district of Gmina Lidzbark Warmiński, within Lidzbark County, Warmian-Masurian Voivodeship, in northern Poland.
