= Łaniewo, Warmian-Masurian Voivodeship =

Łaniewo
- Village
- Location within Poland
- Coordinates: 54°6′N 20°27′E
- Country: Poland
- Voivodeship: Warmian-Masurian
- County: Lidzbark
- Gmina: Lidzbark Warmiński
- Time zone: UTC+1 (CET)
  - Summer (DST): UTC+2 (CEST)
- Vehicle registration: NLI

Łaniewo [waˈɲɛvɔ] is a village in the administrative district of Gmina Lidzbark Warmiński, within Lidzbark County, Warmian-Masurian Voivodeship, in northern Poland. It is located approximately 9 km (6 mi) west of Lidzbark Warmiński and 36 km (22 mi) north of the regional capital Olsztyn. It is located in Warmia.

In June 1807, Łaniewo was the place where the Polish division of General Jan Henryk Dąbrowski joined the French Grande Armée before the Battle of Friedland.
