= Kwiecewo =

- Village
- Location within Poland
- Coordinates: 53°57′N 20°19′E
- Country: Poland
- Voivodeship: Warmian-Masurian
- County: Olsztyn
- Gmina: Świątki
- Population: 522

Kwiecewo [kfjɛˈt͡sɛvɔ] is a village in the administrative district of Gmina Świątki, within Olsztyn County, Warmian-Masurian Voivodeship, in northern Poland.
