= Jankowo, Olsztyn County =

Jankowo
- Village
- Location within Poland
- Coordinates: 53°56′N 20°17′E
- Country: Poland
- Voivodeship: Warmian-Masurian
- County: Olsztyn
- Gmina: Świątki

Jankowo [janˈkɔvɔ] is a village in the administrative district of Gmina Świątki, within Olsztyn County, Warmian-Masurian Voivodeship, in northern Poland.
