= Klony, Warmian-Masurian Voivodeship =

Klony
- Village
- Location within Poland
- Coordinates: 53°59′N 20°13′E
- Country: Poland
- Voivodeship: Warmian-Masurian
- County: Olsztyn
- Gmina: Świątki

Klony [ˈklɔnɨ] is a village in the administrative district of Gmina Świątki, within Olsztyn County, Warmian-Masurian Voivodeship, in northern Poland.
