= Drwęca, Lidzbark County =

Drwęca
- Village
- Location within Poland
- Coordinates: 54°11′18″N 20°22′40″E
- Country: Poland
- Voivodeship: Warmian-Masurian
- County: Lidzbark
- Gmina: Lidzbark Warmiński

Drwęca [ˈdrvɛnt͡sa] is a village in the administrative district of Gmina Lidzbark Warmiński, within Lidzbark County, Warmian-Masurian Voivodeship, in northern Poland.
