= Świątki, Warmian-Masurian Voivodeship =

Świątki
- Village
- Location within Poland
- Coordinates: 53°55′N 20°14′E
- Country: Poland
- Voivodeship: Warmian-Masurian
- County: Olsztyn
- Gmina: Świątki
- Population: 938

Świątki (Polish: [ˈɕfjɔntkʲi]) is a village in Olsztyn County, Warmian-Masurian Voivodeship, in northern Poland. It is the seat of the gmina (administrative district) called Gmina Świątki.
