= Krosno, Lidzbark County =

Krosno
- Village
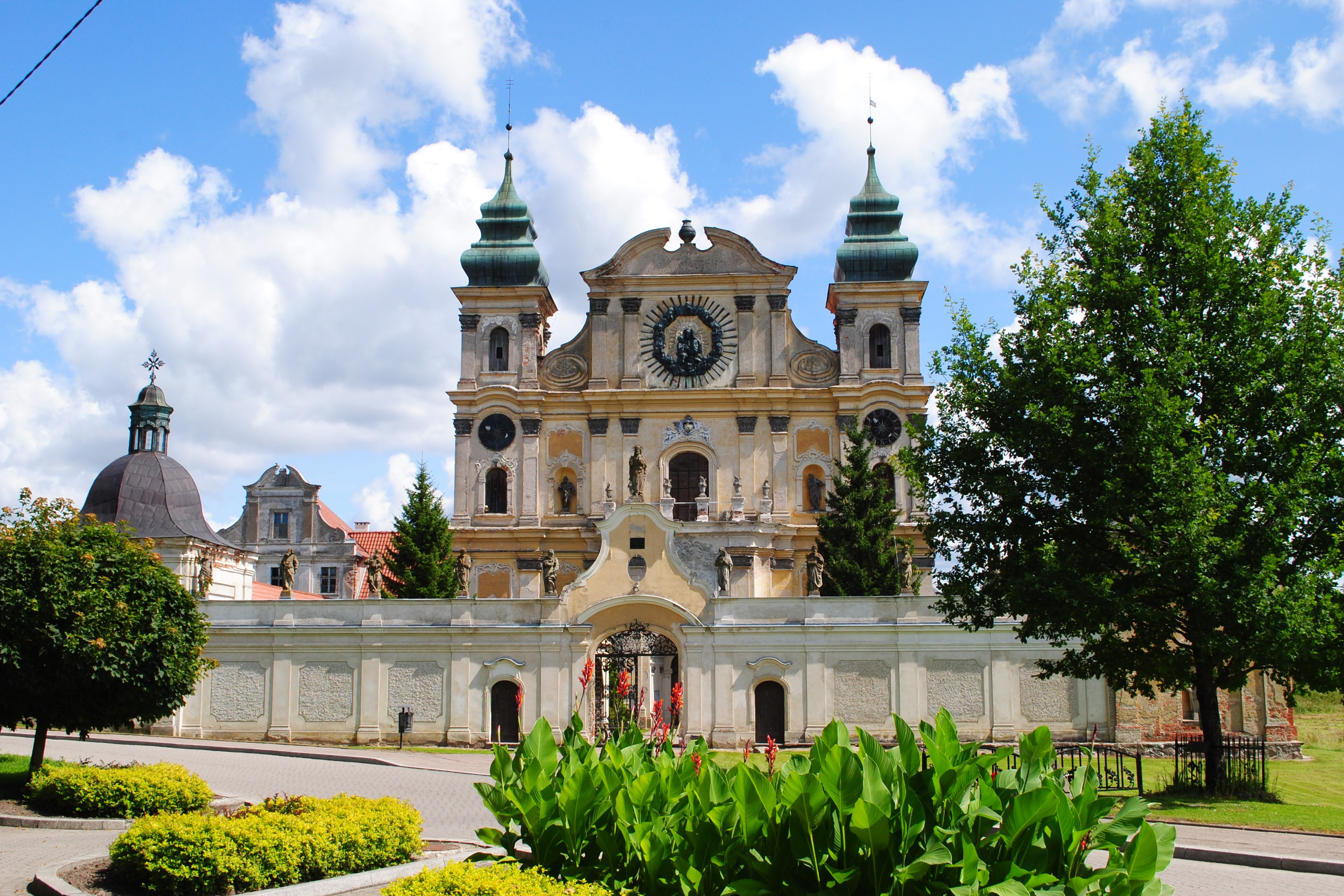
- Church of the Visitation in Krosno

- Location within Poland
- Coordinates: 54°7′54″N 20°10′15″E
- Country: Poland
- Voivodeship: Warmian-Masurian
- County: Lidzbark
- Gmina: Orneta
- Population: 380
- Time zone: UTC+1 (CET)
  - Summer (DST): UTC+2 (CEST)
- Vehicle registration: NLI

Krosno [ˈkrɔsnɔ] is a village in the administrative district of Gmina Orneta, within Lidzbark County, Warmian-Masurian Voivodeship, in northern Poland.

Before 1772, the area was part of Kingdom of Poland, and in 1772–1945 it belonged to Prussia and Germany (East Prussia).
