= Lidzbark County =

Lidzbark County Powiat lidzbarski
- County
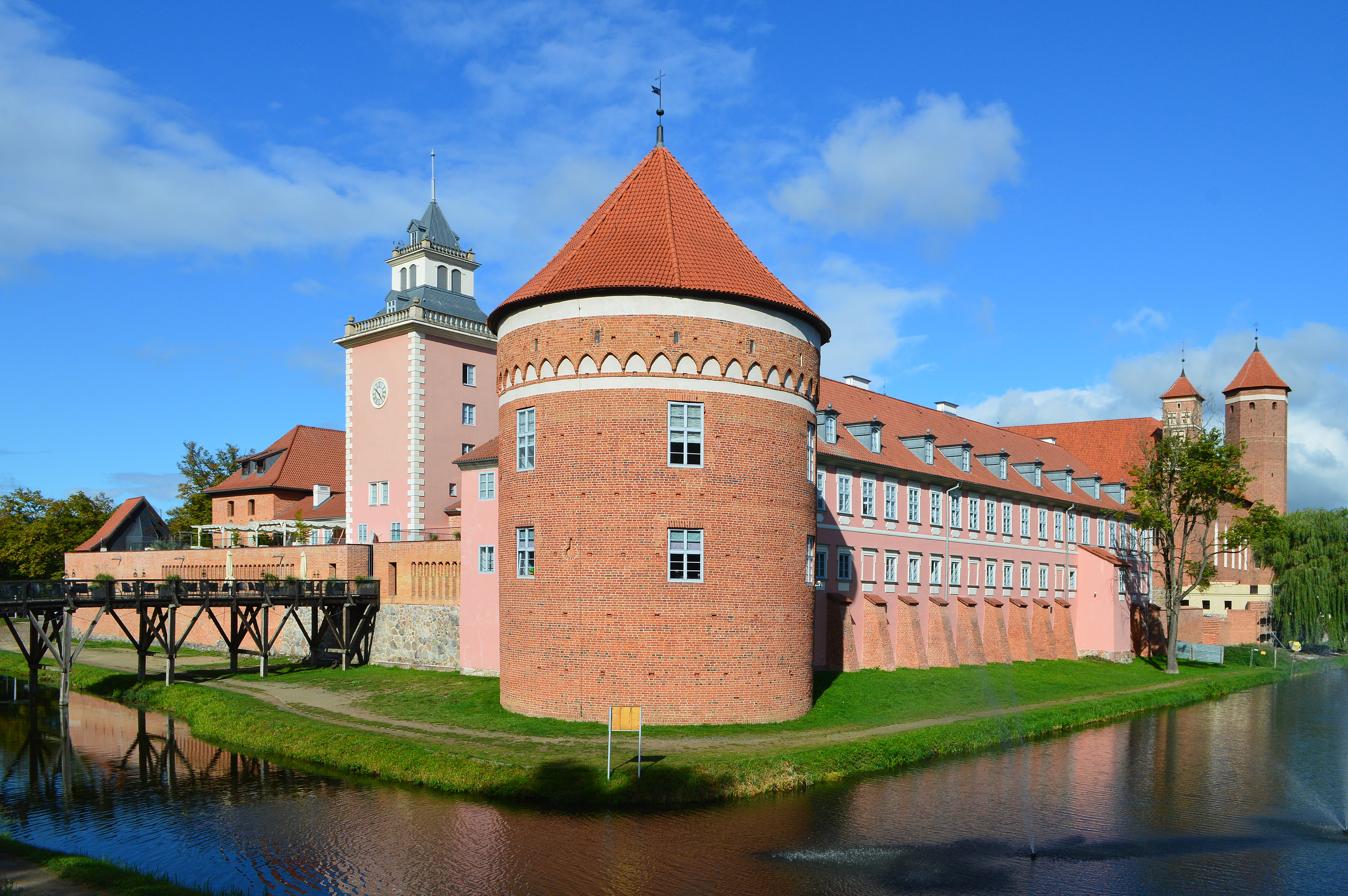
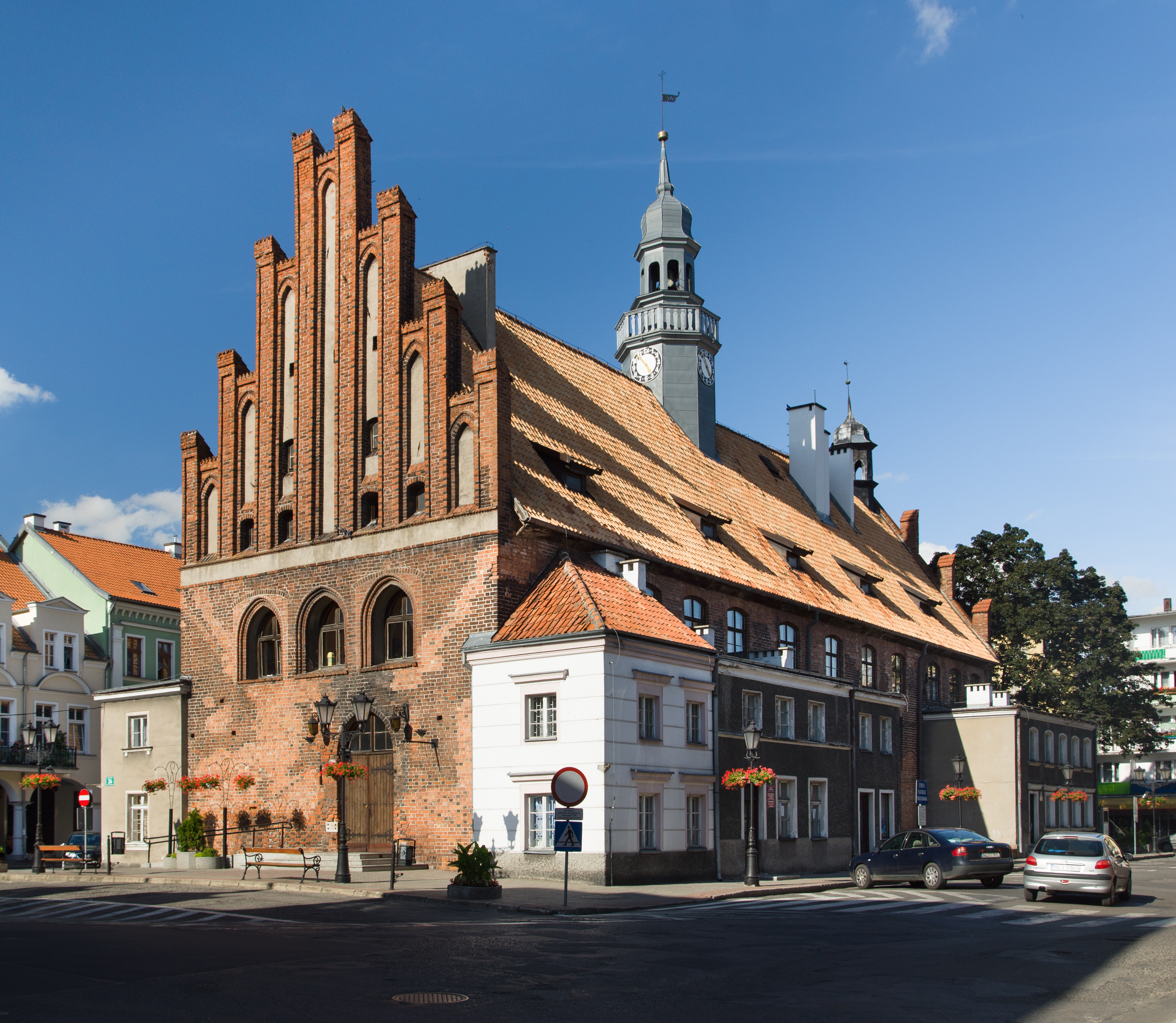
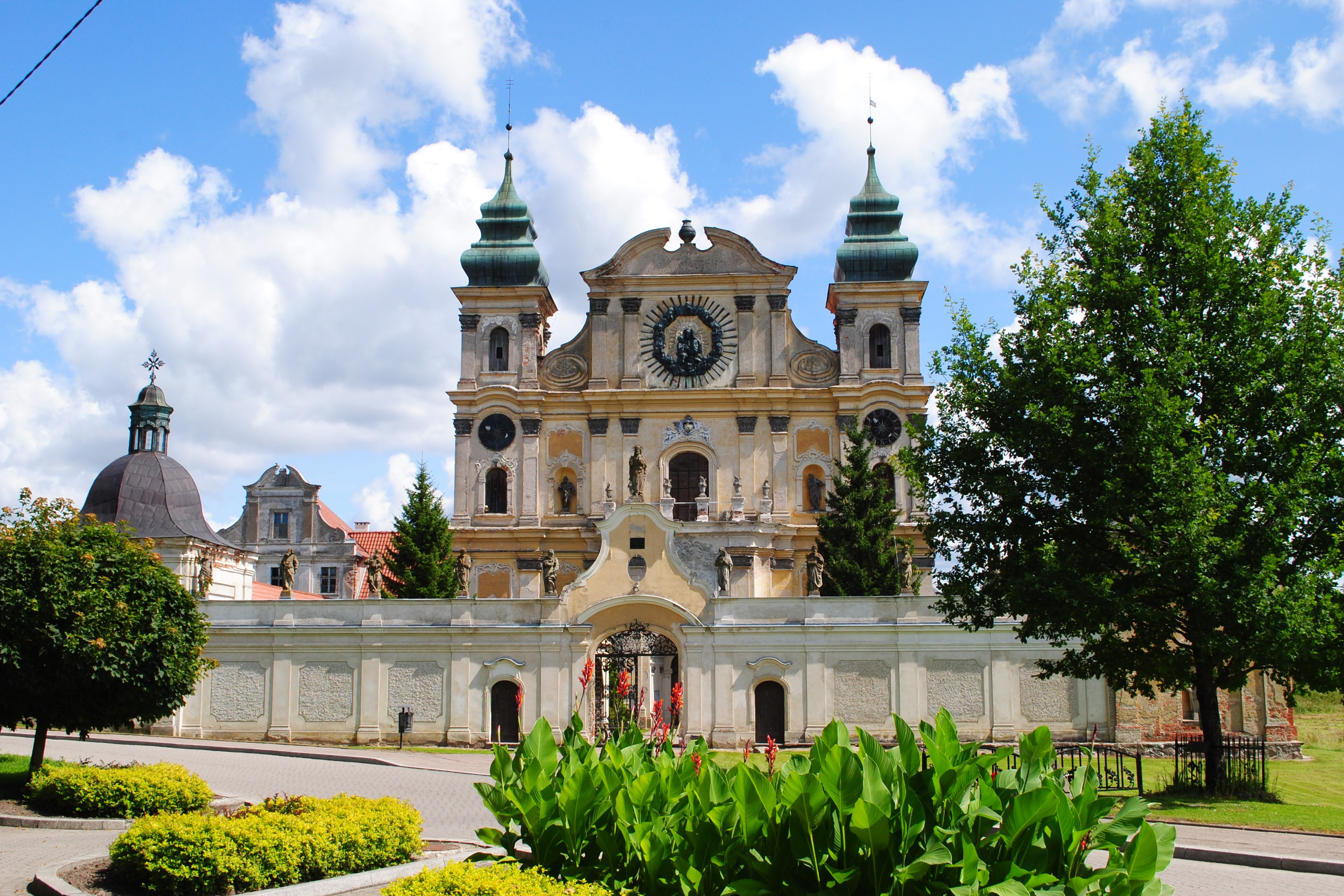
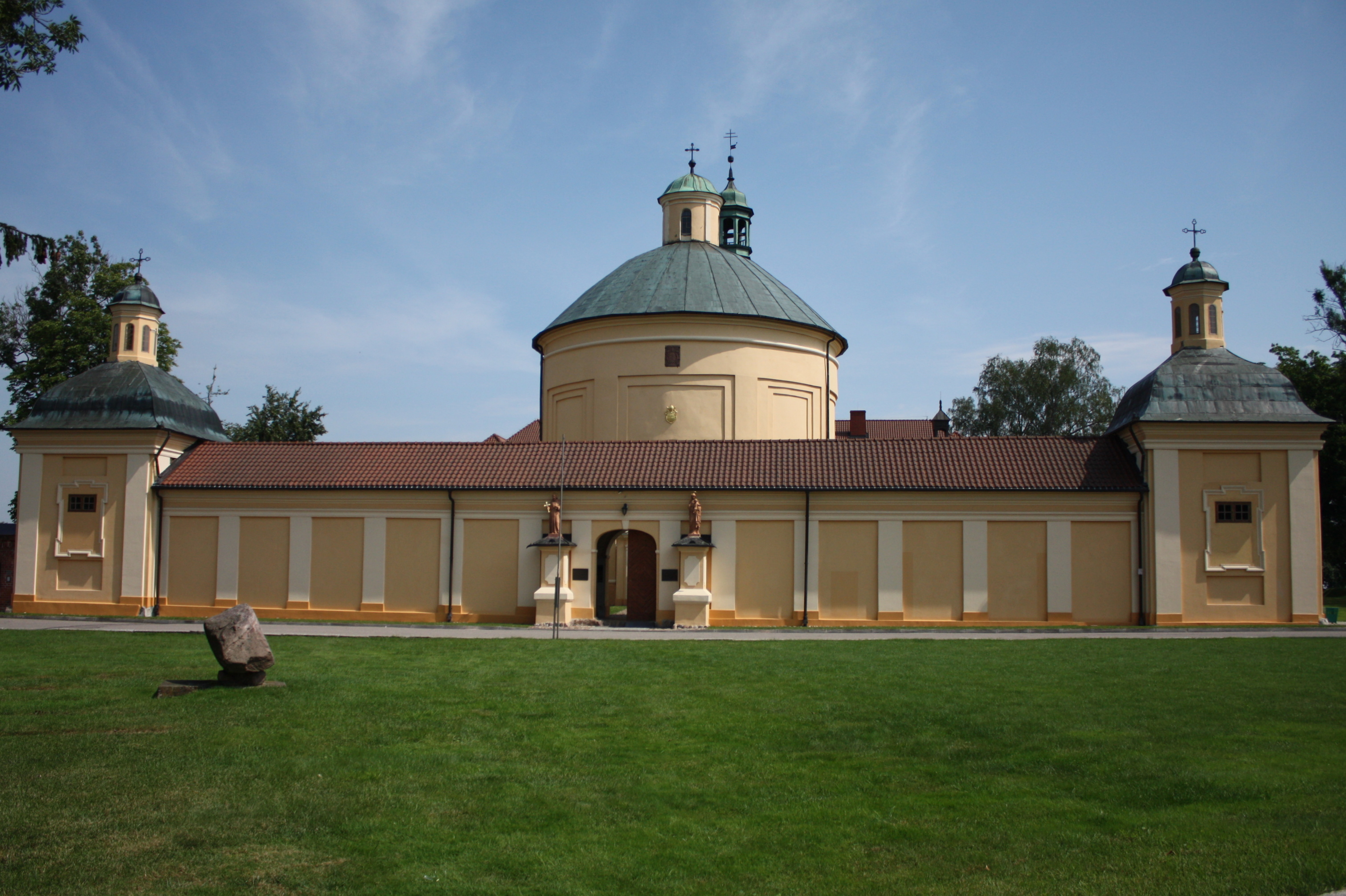
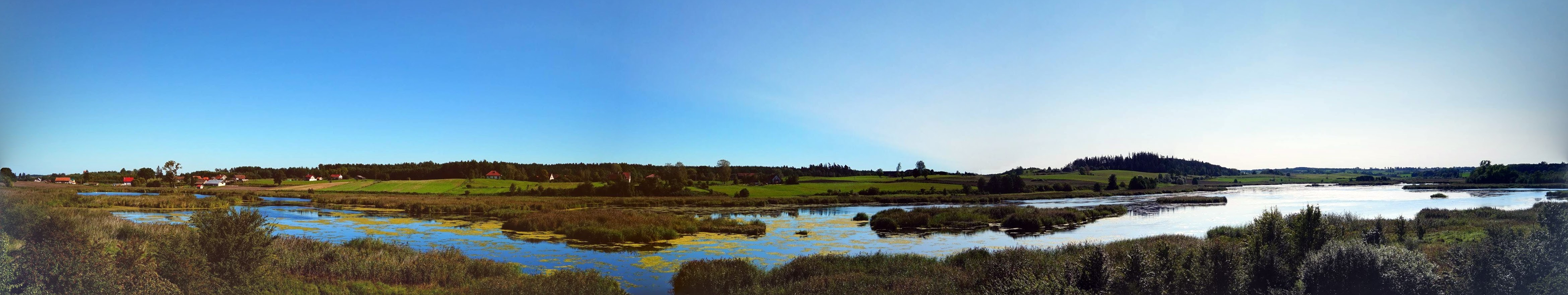
- Lidzbark Castle complex Orneta town hall Visitation church in Krosno Sanctuary in Stoczek Klasztorny Bartniki swamp near Kiwity

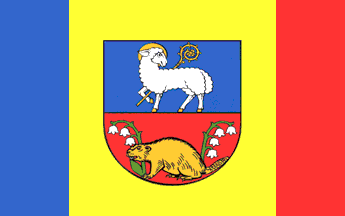
- Flag Coat of arms

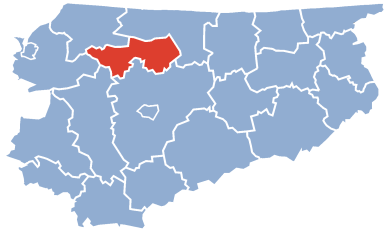
- Location within the voivodeship

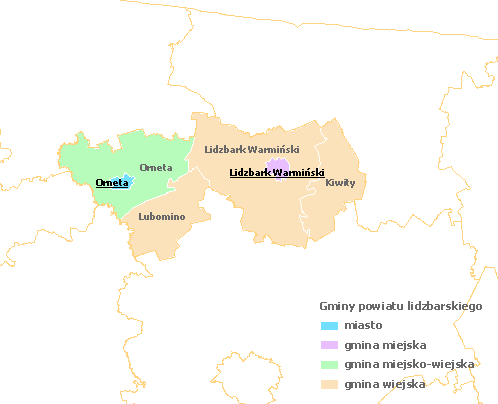
- Division into gminas
- Coordinates (Lidzbark Warmiński): 54°7′N 20°35′E
- Country: Poland
- Voivodeship: Warmian-Masurian
- Seat: Lidzbark Warmiński
- Gminas: Total 5 (incl. 1 urban): Lidzbark Warmiński; Gmina Kiwity; Gmina Lidzbark Warmiński; Gmina Lubomino; Gmina Orneta

Area
  - Total: 924.42 km^{2} (356.92 sq mi)

Population (2006)
  - Total: 43,006
  - Density: 46.522/km^{2} (120.49/sq mi)
  - Urban: 25,770
  - Rural: 17,236
- Time zone: UTC+1 (CET)
  - Summer (DST): UTC+2 (CEST)
- Car plates: NLI
- Website: www.powiatlidzbarski.pl

Lidzbark County (Polish: powiat lidzbarski) is a unit of territorial administration and local government (powiat) in Warmian-Masurian Voivodeship, northern Poland. Its administrative seat and largest town is Lidzbark Warmiński, which lies 38 kilometres (24 mi) north of the regional capital Olsztyn. The only other town in the county is Orneta, lying 30 km (19 mi) west of Lidzbark Warmiński.

The county covers an area of 924.42 square kilometres (356.9 sq mi). As of 2006 its total population is 43,006, out of which the population of Lidzbark Warmiński is 16,390, that of Orneta is 9,380, and the rural population is 17,236.

== History ==
Lidzbark County came into being on January 1, 1999, as a result of the Polish local government reforms passed in 1998.

== Neighbouring counties ==
Lidzbark County is bordered by Bartoszyce County to the north-east, Olsztyn County to the south, Ostróda County to the south-west, and Elbląg County and Braniewo County to the west.

== Administrative division ==
The county is subdivided into five gminas (one urban, one urban-rural and three rural). These are listed in the following table, in descending order of population.

Gmina	Type	Area (km^{2})	Population (2006)	Seat
Lidzbark Warmiński	urban	14.3	16,390	
Gmina Orneta	urban-rural	244.1	12,701	Orneta
Gmina Lidzbark Warmiński	rural	371.0	6,733	Lidzbark Warmiński *
Gmina Lubomino	rural	149.6	3,717	Lubomino
Gmina Kiwity	rural	145.4	3,465	Kiwity
* seat not part of the gmina
