= German exonyms (Olsztyn County) =

This is a list of German-language exonyms for places in Olsztyn County, Warmian-Masurian Voivodeship, Poland.

Polish	German
Barcikowo	Battatron
Barczewko	Alt Wartenburg
Barczewo	Wartenburg
Barkweda	Bergfriede
Bartąg	Groß Bertung
Bartążek	Klein Bertung
Bartołty Małe	Klein Bartelsdorf
Bartołty Wielkie	Groß Bartelsdorf
Bisztynek	Bischofstein
Biskupiec	Bischofsburg
Brąswałd	Braunswalde
Bukwałd	Gross Buchwalde
Butryny	Wutrienen
Cerkiewnik	Münsterberg
Dągi	Dongen
Derc	Derz
Dobrąg	Debrong
Dobre Miasto	Guttstadt
Dorotowo	Darethen
Dywity	Diwitten
Frączki	Fleming
Gady	Jadden
Giedajty	Gedaithen
Giławy	Gillau
Gietrzwałd	Dietrichswalde
Głotowo	Glottau
Gradki	Gradtken
Gronity	Gronitten
Gryźliny	Grieslienen
Gutkowo	Göttkendorf
Jedzbark	Hirschberg
Jonkowo	Jonkendorf
Jeziorany	Seeburg
Kajny	Kainen
Kaplityny	Kaplitainen
Kierzbuń	Kirschbaum
Kierźliny	Kirschlainen
Kieźliny	Köslienen
Klebark Mały	Klein Kleeberg
Klebark Wielki	Gross Kleeberg
Klewki	Klaukendorf
Knopin	Knopen
Kromerowo	Krämersdorf
Kronowo	Gross Kronau
Kudypy	Kudippen
Kwiecewo	Queetz
Lamkowo	Gross Lemkendorf
Leszno	Leschnau
Łęgajny	Lengainen
Linowo	Leinau
Ługwałd	Hochwalde
Maruny	Groß Maraunen
Mątki	Mondtken
Miodówko	Honigswalde
Mokiny	Mokainen
Myki	Micken
Naglady	Nagladen
Naterki	Nattern
Nerwik	Nerwigk
Nikielkowo	Nickelsdorf
Nowa Wieś	Neu Bartelsdorf
Nowe Kawkowo	Neu Kockendorf
Nowe Włóki	Neu Vierzighuben
Olsztyn	Allenstein
Odryty	Odritten
Patryki	Patricken
Pluski	Plautzig
Próle	Prohlen
Purda Wielka	Groß Purden
Purdka	Klein Purden
Ramsowo	Groß Ramsau
Ramsówko	Klein Ramsau
Rentyny	Rentienen
Różnowo	Rosenau
Ruszajny	Reuschhagen
Sętal	Sussenthal
Skajboty	Skaibotten
Słupy	Stolpen
Spręcowo	Spiegelberg
Stare Włóki	Alt Vierzighuben
Stary Olsztyn	Alt Allenstein
Stawiguda	Stabigotten
Stękiny	Stenkienen
Szałstry	Schaustern
Sząbruk	Schönbruck
Świątki	Heiligenthal
Tomaszkowo	Thomsdorf
Tuławki	Tollack
Tumiany	Daumen
Unieszewo	Schonefeld
Warkały	Warkallen
Węgajty	Wengaithen
Wipsowo	Wieps
Woryty	Woritten
Wójtowo	Fittigsdorf
Zalbki	Salbkeim

== See also ==
- List of German exonyms for places in Poland
- German exonyms (Warmia)
