= List of German exonyms in the Warmian-Masurian Voivodeship =

This is a list of German language place names in Poland, now exonyms for towns and villages in the Warmian-Masurian Voivodeship.

== List ==
| Polish name | German name | County | Gmina |
|---|---|---|---|
| Barciany | Barten | Kętrzyn | Barciany |
| Barczewo | Wartenburg | Olsztyn | Barczewo |
| Bartoszyce | Bartenstein | Bartoszyce | Urban gmina |
| Biała Piska | Bialla, 1938-1945 Gehlenburg | Pisz | Biała Piska |
| Biskupiec | Bischofsburg | Olsztyn | Biskupiec |
| Bisztynek | Bischofstein | Bartoszyce | Bisztynek |
| Braniewo | Braunsberg | Braniewo | Urban gmina |
| Dąbrówno | Gilgenburg | Ostróda | Dąbrówno |
| Dobre Miasto | Guttstadt | Olsztyn | Dobre Miasto |
| Działdowo | Soldau | Działdowo | Urban gmina |
| Elbląg | Elbing | City county | City gmina |
| Ełk | Lyck | Ełk | Urban gmina |
| Frombork | Frauenburg | Braniewo | Frombork |
| Giżycko | Lötzen | Giżycko | Urban gmina |
| Gołdap | Goldap | Gołdap | Gołdap |
| Górowo Iławeckie | Landsberg | Bartoszyce | Górowo Iławeckie |
| Grzybowo | before 1929 Grzybowen, Birkensee | Giżycko | Ryn |
| Gutkowo | Göttkendorf | Olsztyn | Jonkowo |
| Iława | Deutsch Eylau | Iława | Urban gmina |
| Jaroty | Jomendorf | Olsztyn | Stawiguda |
| Jeziorany | Seeburg | Olsztyn | Jeziorany |
| Kętrzyn | Rastenburg | Kętrzyn | Urban gmina |
| Lidzbark Warmiński | Heilsberg | Lidzbark | Urban gmina |
| Likusy | Likusen | Nidzica | Nidzica |
| Łęgajny | Lengainen | Olsztyn | Barczewo |
| Łupstych | Abstich | Olsztyn | Gietrzwałd |
| Łyna | Lahna | Nidzica | Nidzica |
| Miłakowo | Liebstadt | Ostróda | Miłakowo |
| Miłomłyn | Liebemühl | Ostróda | Miłomłyn |
| Morąg | Mohrungen | Ostróda | Morąg |
| Mrągowo | Sensburg | Mrągowo | Urban gmina |
| Nidzica | Neidenburg | Nidzica | Urban gmina |
| Olecko | Marggrabowa, 1928 Treuburg | Olecko | Olecko |
| Olsztyn | Allenstein | City County | City Gmina |
| Olsztynek | Hohenstein | Olsztyn | Olsztynek |
| Orneta | Wormditt | Lidzbark | Orneta |
| Orzysz | Arys | Pisz | Orzysz |
| Ostróda | Osterode | Ostróda | Urban gmina |
| Pasłęk | Preussisch Holland | Elbląg | Pasłęk |
| Pieniężno | Mehlsack | Braniewo | Pieniężno |
| Pisz | Johannisburg | Pisz | Urban gmina |
| Pozorty | Posorten | Iława | Zalewo |
| Redykajny | Redigkainen | Olsztyn | Dywity |
| Reszel | Rößel | Kętrzyn | Reszel |
| Ryn | Rhein | Giżycko | Ryn |
| Sępopol | Schippenbeil | Bartoszyce | Sępopol |
| Susz | Rosenberg in Westpreußen | Iława | Susz |
| Szczytno | Ortelsburg | Szczytno | Urban gmina |
| Szkotowo | Skottau | Nidzica | Kozłowo |
| Tomaszkowo | Thomsdorf | Olsztyn | Stawiguda |
| Tuławki | Tollack | Olsztyn | Dywity |
| Tumiany | Daumen | Olsztyn | Barczewo |
| Unieszewo | Schonefeld | Olsztyn | Gietrzwałd |
| Wadąg | Wadang | Olsztyn | Dywity |
| Warkały | Warkallen | Olsztyn | Jonkowo |
| Węgajty | Wengaithen | Olsztyn | Jonkowo |
| Węgorzewo | Angerburg | Węgorzewo | Węgorzewo |
| Wipsowo | Wieps | Olsztyn | Barczewo |
| Woryty | Woritten | Olsztyn | Gietrzwałd |
| Wójtowo | Fittigsdorf | Olsztyn | Barczewo |
| Zalbki | Salbkeim | Olsztyn | Dywity |
| Zalewo | Saalfeld | Iława | Zalewo |

== See also ==
- List of German exonyms for places in Poland
