= Klebark =

Klebark may refer to the following places in Poland:

- Klebark Mały
- Klebark Wielki
