= Zarak (disambiguation) =

Zarak is a 1956 British film. Other meanings of Zarak include:

- Lord Zarak is the binary-bonded partner of the arachnid Scorponok, a Transformers character
- Zarak the arachnid DemonLord from Weaponlord
- Zarak, Afghanistan, a small village in Afghanistan
- Zarak, Iran, a village in Chaharmahal and Bakhtiari Province, Iran
- Zarak, Fars, a village in Fars Province, Iran
- Zarak-e Tang Khas, a village in Fars Province, Iran

== See also ==
- Zarek (disambiguation)
