= Lapka =

Lapka may refer to:

- Łapka, a village in northern Poland
- Lapka (river), a river in Saint Petersburg, Russia
- Lapka (surname)
