= Prole =

Prole or proles may refer to:

- A member of the proletariat, a lower social class, or the working class
  - In particular, "proles" is frequently used in this sense in the language of the novel Nineteen Eighty-Four
- Prole, Iowa, a community in the midwestern United States
- Próle, a village in Poland
- Proles, a synonym for race in biological taxonomy
