= Zarek =

Zarek may refer to:

- Żarek, a village in Warmian-Masurian Voivodeship, Poland
- Zarek Valentin, an American soccer player
- Tom Zarek, a character from the modern version of Battlestar Galactica
- Zarek, a Kree character from Marvel Comics

== See also ==
- Zarak (disambiguation)
