= Czerwony Bór, Warmian-Masurian Voivodeship =

Czerwony Bór
- Settlement
- Location within Poland
- Coordinates: 53°50′34″N 20°44′27″E
- Country: Poland
- Voivodeship: Warmian-Masurian
- County: Olsztyn
- Gmina: Barczewo

Czerwony Bór (Polish: [t͡ʂɛrˈvɔnɨ ˈbur]) is a settlement in the administrative district of Gmina Barczewo, within Olsztyn County, Warmian-Masurian Voivodeship, in northern Poland.
