= Dąbrówka Mała, Olsztyn County =

Dąbrówka Mała
- Settlement
- Location within Poland
- Coordinates: 53°50′34″N 20°38′45″E
- Country: Poland
- Voivodeship: Warmian-Masurian
- County: Olsztyn
- Gmina: Barczewo

Dąbrówka Mała [dɔmˈbrufka ˈmawa] is a settlement in the administrative district of Gmina Barczewo, within Olsztyn County, Warmian-Masurian Voivodeship, in northern Poland.
