= Leszno Małe =

- Village
- Location within Poland
- Coordinates: 53°45′56″N 20°52′32″E
- Country: Poland
- Voivodeship: Warmian-Masurian
- County: Olsztyn
- Gmina: Barczewo
- Time zone: UTC+1 (CET)
  - Summer (DST): UTC+2 (CEST)
- Vehicle registration: NOL

Leszno Małe [ˈlɛʂnɔ ˈmawɛ] is a village in the administrative district of Gmina Barczewo, within Olsztyn County, Warmian-Masurian Voivodeship, in northern Poland. It is located in Warmia.

The adjective Małe, meaning "Little" was added to the name of the village to distinguish it from the nearby village of Leszno, also called Leszno Wielkie ("Big Leszno") in the past. In 1857, the village had a population of 6.
