= Bark, Warmian-Masurian Voivodeship =

Bark
- Village
- Location within Poland
- Coordinates: 53°48′52″N 20°39′30″E
- Country: Poland
- Voivodeship: Warmian-Masurian
- County: Olsztyn
- Gmina: Barczewo

Bark [bark] is a village in the administrative district of Gmina Barczewo, within Olsztyn County, Warmian-Masurian Voivodeship, in northern Poland.
