= Robert Pruszkowski =

- Born: 1 February 1907; Wartenburg, East Prussia, German Empire (Barczewo, Poland)
- Died: 30 April 1983 (aged 76); Lübeck, Germany
- Occupation: Roman Catholic priest

Robert Pruszkowski (1 February 1907 – 30 April 1983) was a German Roman Catholic priest. A Parish priest in several towns in East Prussia, he was arrested in 1940 for hearing confessions in Polish and was held in captivity in the Priest Barracks of Dachau Concentration Camp until 1945. After World War II he worked in West Germany.

Pruszkowski was born in Wartenburg, East Prussia (Barczewo, Poland), the son of Robert Pruszkowski, a prison guard in the Wartenburg prison, and Helene Pruszkowski.

He became chaplain at the St. Jakobus Church in Allenstein (Olsztyn) in 1933, later on in Stuhm (Sztum). In 1938 he became the parish priest of the Catholic Church in Wengoyen (Węgój). Here, he was denounced for having heard the confession of Polish workers in Polish. He was arrested and sent to Dachau Concentration Camp in 1940. On 23 November 1940, shortly after his arrival, he mentioned his profession to a SS guard who immediately ordered him and another detainee to slay each other "with all their might". He remained in custody in the Priest Barracks of Dachau Concentration Camp until the liberation of the camp in April 1945.

After World War II he worked at the Chiemsee for a year and moved to Preetz in Schleswig-Holstein in April 1946 by request of bishop Maximilian Kaller. On behalf of the Roman Catholic Diocese of Osnabrück he was responsible for 46 villages in a radius of 30 km. The region, traditionally Lutheran, had seen the significant growth of Catholic Christians from 25 in 1945 to about 2000 as a result of the Flight and expulsion of Germans.

He remained in Preetz until 1960. From 1960 to 1962 Pruszkowski served in Bad Oldesloe and from 1962 until his retirement in 1981 in Schönberg near Kiel at the Baltic Sea. He died 30 April 1983 in Lübeck.

In 2013 a street in Preetz was named in his honour.
