= Dadaj, Warmian-Masurian Voivodeship =

Dadaj
- Settlement
- Location within Poland
- Coordinates: 53°51′15″N 20°50′59″E
- Country: Poland
- Voivodeship: Warmian-Masurian
- County: Olsztyn
- Gmina: Barczewo

Dadaj [ˈdadai̯] is a settlement in the administrative district of Gmina Barczewo, within Olsztyn County, Warmian-Masurian Voivodeship, in northern Poland.
