= Niedźwiedź, Warmian-Masurian Voivodeship =

Niedźwiedź
- Village
- Location within Poland
- Coordinates: 53°50′28″N 20°49′15″E
- Country: Poland
- Voivodeship: Warmian-Masurian
- County: Olsztyn
- Gmina: Barczewo
- Population: 140

Niedźwiedź [ˈɲɛd͡ʑvʲɛt͡ɕ] is a village in the administrative district of Gmina Barczewo, within Olsztyn County, Warmian-Masurian Voivodeship, in northern Poland.
