= Koronowo, Warmian-Masurian Voivodeship =

Koronowo
- Settlement
- Location within Poland
- Coordinates: 53°51′53″N 20°47′28″E
- Country: Poland
- Voivodeship: Warmian-Masurian
- County: Olsztyn
- Gmina: Barczewo

Koronowo [kɔrɔˈnɔvɔ] is a settlement in the administrative district of Gmina Barczewo, within Olsztyn County, Warmian-Masurian Voivodeship, in northern Poland.
