= Emil Stürtz =

German politician and Nazi official (1892~1945)

Gauleiter Gau March of Brandenburg
- In office 31 January 1939 – 21 April 1945
- Preceded by: Position created
- Succeeded by: Position abolished

Gauleiter Gau Kurmark
- In office 7 August 1936 – 31 January 1939
- Preceded by: Wilhelm Kube
- Succeeded by: Position abolished

Oberpräsident Province of Brandenburg
- In office 13 August 1936 – 21 April 1945
- Preceded by: Wilhelm Kube
- Succeeded by: Position abolished

Oberpräsident Province of Posen-West Prussia
- In office 13 August 1936 – 30 September 1938
- Preceded by: Wilhelm Kube
- Succeeded by: Position abolished

Deputy Gauleiter Gau Westphalia-South
- In office 1 January 1931 – 7 August 1936
- Preceded by: Position created
- Succeeded by: Fritz Bracht (acting)

Deputy Gauleiter Gau Westphalia
- In office 1 October 1930 – 31 December 1930
- Succeeded by: Position abolished

Personal details
- Born: Erich Emil Arthur Hermann Stürtz; 15 November 1893 Wieps, Province of East Prussia, Kingdom of Prussia, German Empire
- Died: 31 December 1945 (official death date, disappeared 21 April 1945) Berlin, Nazi Germany
- Party: Nazi Party
- Occupation: Locksmith; Driver

Military service
- Allegiance: German Empire
- Branch/service: Imperial German Navy
- Years of service: 1914–1918
- Rank: Seaman
- Unit: SMS Seydlitz; U-Boat 128
- Battles/wars: World War I

Emil Stürtz (15 November 1892 – missing 21 April 1945) was a German Nazi Party official and politician who served as the Oberpräsident and Gauleiter in Brandenburg from 1936 to 1945. He also was a member of the Reichstag from 1930 to 1945, went missing during the Battle of Berlin and was officially declared dead in 1957.

== Early life ==
Stürtz was born in Wieps, a village outside of Allenstein in East Prussia. He grew up in Königsberg, and after attending the Friedrich Bessel Realschule, he joined the merchant marine as a seaman in 1912. When the First World War broke out, he joined the Imperial German Navy as a sailor. He served aboard the battlecruiser SMS Seydlitz and participated in the Battle of Jutland in 1916. He transferred to the U-boat arm and served aboard U-128 until Spring 1918 when he was declared unfit for duty due to severe illness. He became a war pensioner and then worked in various jobs as a locksmith repairman and a driver in Hattingen.

== Nazi career ==
On 28 December 1925, Stürtz joined the National Socialist German Worker's Party (membership number 26,929) and became the press and propaganda leader for the Ortsgruppe (Local Group) in Hattingen. He moved up to Kreisleiter (County Leader) in the city of Dortmund in 1926. By 1929 he became Bezirksleiter (District Leader) of the Siegerland district. In November of that year, he was elected a member of the Landtag of the Province of Westphalia where he would serve until 1933 as the chairman of the Nazi faction.

Stürtz next became Business Manager of Gau Westphalia in June 1930 and by September was elected to the national Reichstag for electoral district 18 (Westphalia-South). On 1 October of the same year, the party appointed him Deputy Gauleiter of Gau Westphalia. When the Gau was divided in two on 1 January 1931, he remained Deputy Gauleiter in Gau Westphalia-South.

Upon the Machtergreifung (Nazi seizure of power) in 1933, Stürtz became chairman of the Provincial Committee for the province of Westphalia. In 1935, he was made a Prussian Provincial Councilor (Provinzialrat). On 7 August 1936, Stürtz succeeded Wilhelm Kube as Gauleiter of Gau Kurmark, and as Oberpräsident of the Prussian Provinces of Brandenburg and Posen-West Prussia, thus uniting under his control the highest party and governmental offices in these provinces. He was also made a member of the Prussian State Council. At the next Reichstag election in April 1938, Stürtz was elected as a deputy for electoral constituency 5 (Frankfurt am Oder). Following some territorial restructuring, Gau Kurmark became the Gau March of Brandenburg on 31 January 1939 and Stürtz remained its leader.

In September 1936, Stürtz joined the National Socialist Motor Corps (NSKK) with the rank of Brigadeführer. He would be promoted to Gruppenführer on 30 January 1937 and Obergruppenführer on 30 January 1939.

== World War II and disappearance ==
At the outbreak of World War II on 1 September 1939, Stürtz was appointed the Reich Defense Commissioner (Reichsverteidigungskommissar) for Wehrkreis (Military District) III, which encompassed his Gau of Mark Brandenburg as well as Gau Berlin. Important sectors of the military and civilian war effort were now directly, or at least de facto, subject to his control. On 16 November 1942, the jurisdiction of the Reich Defense Commissioners was changed from the Wehrkreis to the Gau level, and he remained Commissioner only in his Gau. In September 1944, Stürtz became leader of the Volkssturm units within his Gau and was charged with constructing a defensive line against the Red Army advance on the eastern front. Over 40,000 German and foreign laborers were compelled to engage in this effort. On 21 April 1945, during the Battle of Berlin, Stürtz went missing.

After his widow searched for him unsuccessfully for ten years – even amongst the late repatriates (German: Spätheimkehrern) – Stürtz was officially declared dead on 24 August 1957 by the District Court of Düsseldorf, the city of his residence. The court fixed his date of death at 31 December 1945. It was assumed that he was captured by the Red Army and died in captivity.

== See also ==
- List of people who disappeared

== Sources ==
- Höffkes, Karl (1986). Hitlers Politische Generale. Die Gauleiter des Dritten Reiches: ein biographisches Nachschlagewerk. Tübingen: Grabert-Verlag. ISBN 3-87847-163-7.
- Ernst Klee: Das Personenlexikon zum Dritten Reich. p. 513.
- Lilla Joachim (ed.): The NSDAP Gauleiter, Koblenz, 2003, p. 93 (materials from the Federal Archives, No. 13) ISBN 3-86509-020-6.
- Miller, Michael D.; Schulz, Andreas (2021). Gauleiter: The Regional Leaders of the Nazi Party and Their Deputies. Vol. 3. Fonthill Media. ISBN 978-1-781-55826-3.
- Erich Stockhorst : 5000 Heads - Who Was Who in the Third Reich. Arndt, Kiel 2000, ISBN 3-88741-116-1.

== External websites ==
Information about Emil Stürtz in the Reichstag database
