= Barczewo Castle =

Coordinates: 53°49′44″N 20°41′30″E

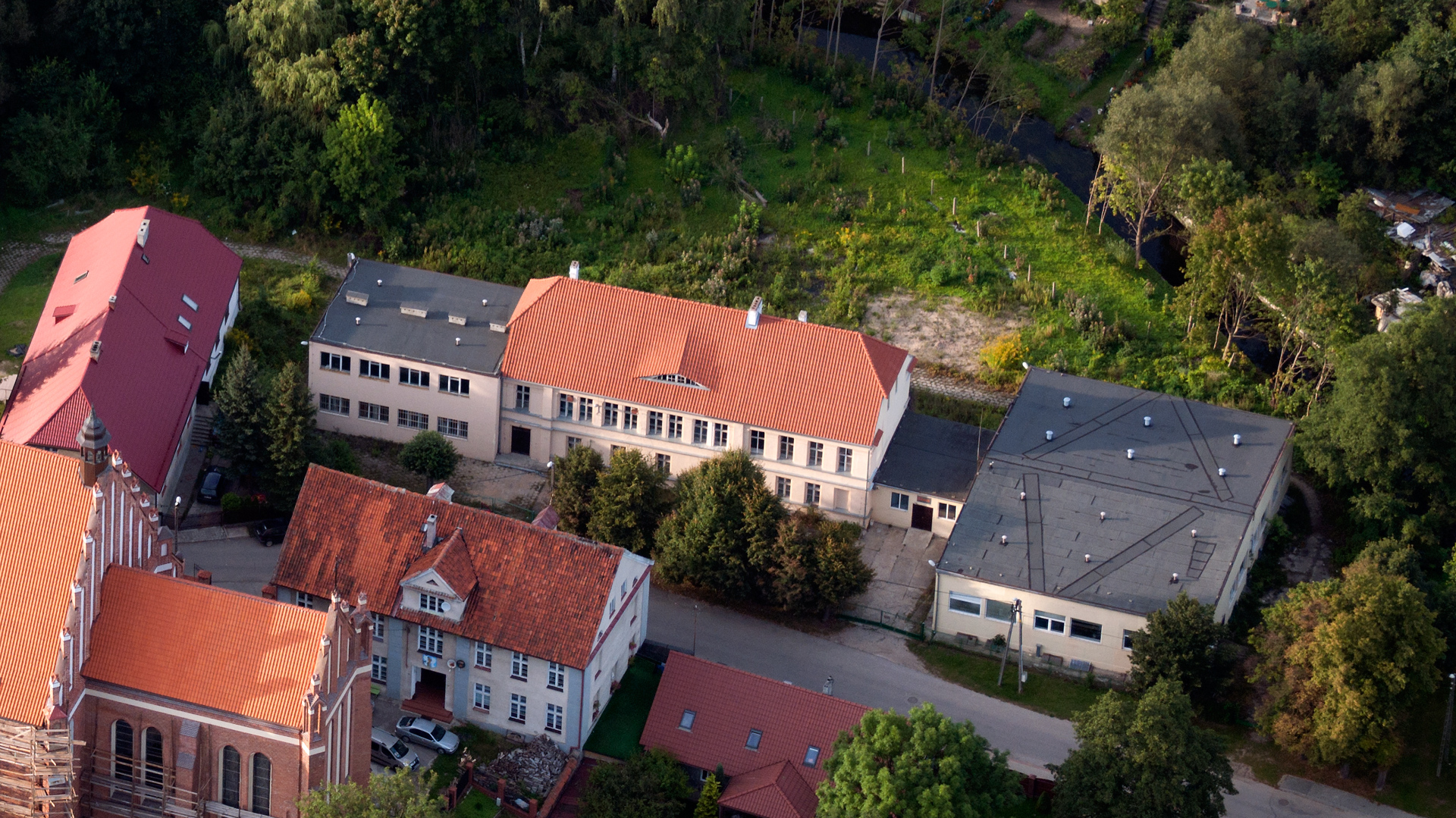
Place of the former Barczewo Castle

Barczewo Castle (Polish: Zamek w Barczewie) was a castle in Barczewo, Olsztyn County, Warmian-Masurian Voivodeship, Poland. No traces of the castle remain.

The castle in Barczewo was erected by Bishop John II Styprock in 1364 simultaneously with the city walls. Destroyed in 1414, it was subsequently rebuilt. The partitions acted as an episcopal seat of wealthy lords. Burned down in 1798, it has since been progressively dismantled. Between 1826 and 1832 a school existed here, only a Gothic style residential wing remains of that school.

The castle has the layout of an irregular quadrilateral. It consisted of a dwelling and outbuilding adjacent to one another.
