= Kronówko =

- Settlement
- Location within Poland
- Coordinates: 53°53′51″N 20°43′20″E
- Country: Poland
- Voivodeship: Warmian-Masurian
- County: Olsztyn
- Gmina: Barczewo

Kronówko [krɔˈnufkɔ] is a settlement in the administrative district of Gmina Barczewo, within Olsztyn County, Warmian-Masurian Voivodeship, in northern Poland.
