= Klucznik =

- Village
- Location within Poland
- Coordinates: 53°45′31″N 20°46′25″E
- Country: Poland
- Voivodeship: Warmian-Masurian
- County: Olsztyn
- Gmina: Barczewo
- Population: 80

Klucznik [ˈklut͡ʂɲik] is a village in the administrative district of Gmina Barczewo, within Olsztyn County, Warmian-Masurian Voivodeship, in northern Poland.

== Notable residents ==
- Otto Parschau (1890-1916) World War I pilot, helped test the pioneering version of the synchronization gear with Anthony Fokker
