= Rejczuchy =

- Village
- Location within Poland
- Coordinates: 53°48′45″N 20°42′14″E
- Country: Poland
- Voivodeship: Warmian-Masurian
- County: Olsztyn
- Gmina: Barczewo

Rejczuchy [rɛi̯ˈt͡ʂuxɨ] is a village in the administrative district of Gmina Barczewo, within Olsztyn County, Warmian-Masurian Voivodeship, in northern Poland.
