= Orzechówko, Olsztyn County =

Orzechówko
- Settlement
- Location within Poland
- Coordinates: 53°50′26″N 20°35′41″E
- Country: Poland
- Voivodeship: Warmian-Masurian
- County: Olsztyn
- Gmina: Barczewo

Orzechówko [ɔʐɛˈxufkɔ] is a settlement in the administrative district of Gmina Barczewo, within Olsztyn County, Warmian-Masurian Voivodeship, in northern Poland.
