= Lamkowo =

- Village
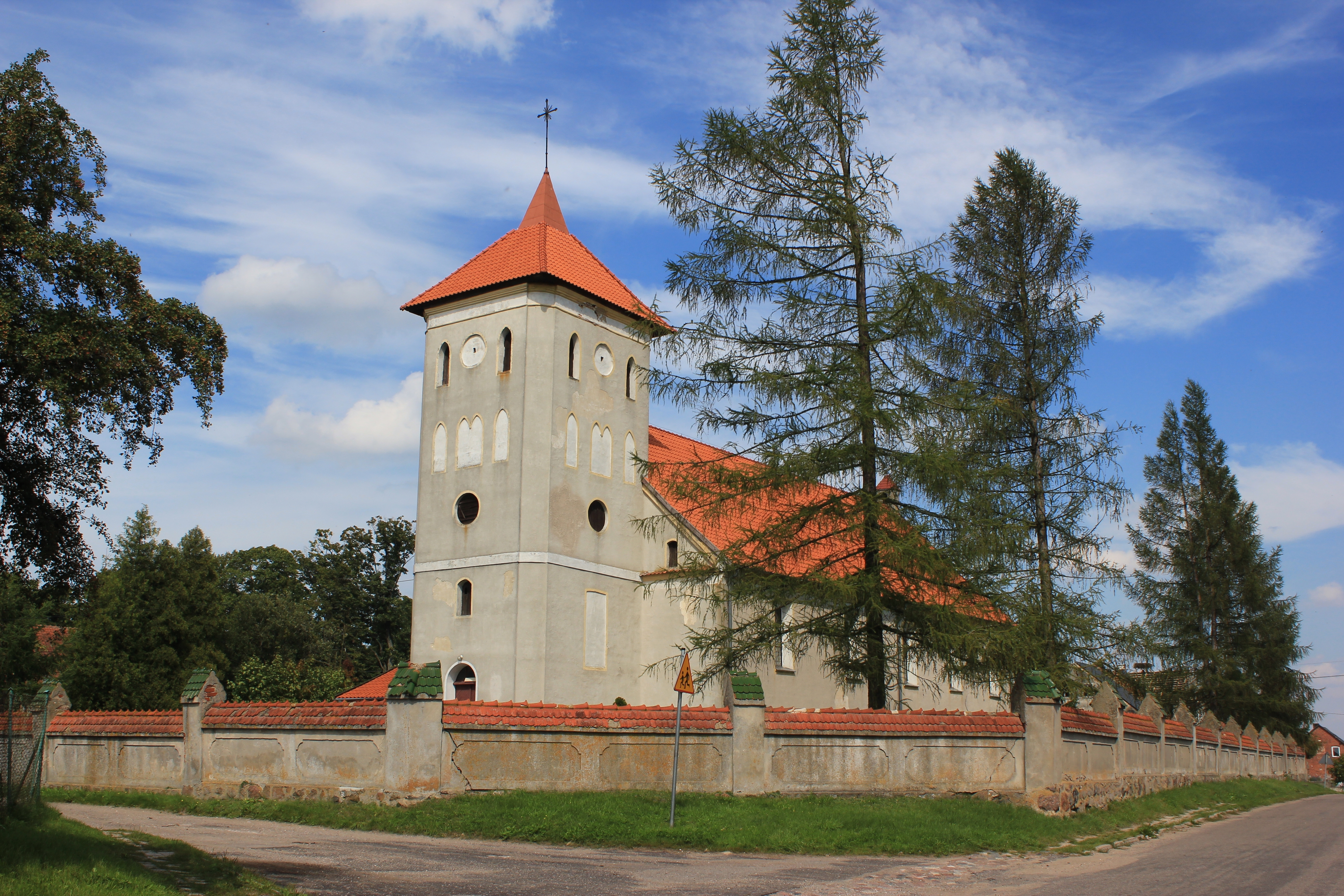
- St. Nicholas church in Lamkowo

- Location within Poland
- Coordinates: 53°55′N 20°41′E
- Country: Poland
- Voivodeship: Warmian-Masurian
- County: Olsztyn
- Gmina: Barczewo
- Population: 100

Lamkowo [lamˈkɔvɔ] is a village in the administrative district of Gmina Barczewo in Olsztyn County, Warmian-Masurian Voivodeship in northern Poland. It is approximately 10 km (6 mi) north of Barczewo and 20 km (12 mi) northeast of the regional capital Olsztyn.
