= Leszno, Warmian-Masurian Voivodeship =

Leszno
- Village
- Location within Poland
- Coordinates: 53°46′31″N 20°52′36″E
- Country: Poland
- Voivodeship: Warmian-Masurian
- County: Olsztyn
- Gmina: Barczewo
- Time zone: UTC+1 (CET)
  - Summer (DST): UTC+2 (CEST)
- Vehicle registration: NOL

Leszno [ˈlɛʂnɔ] is a village in the administrative district of Gmina Barczewo, within Olsztyn County, Warmian-Masurian Voivodeship, in northern Poland. It is located in Warmia.

In the past, the village was also called Leszno Wielkie to distinguish it from the nearby settlement of Leszno Małe. In 1857, it had a population of 168.
