= Klimkowo =

- Village
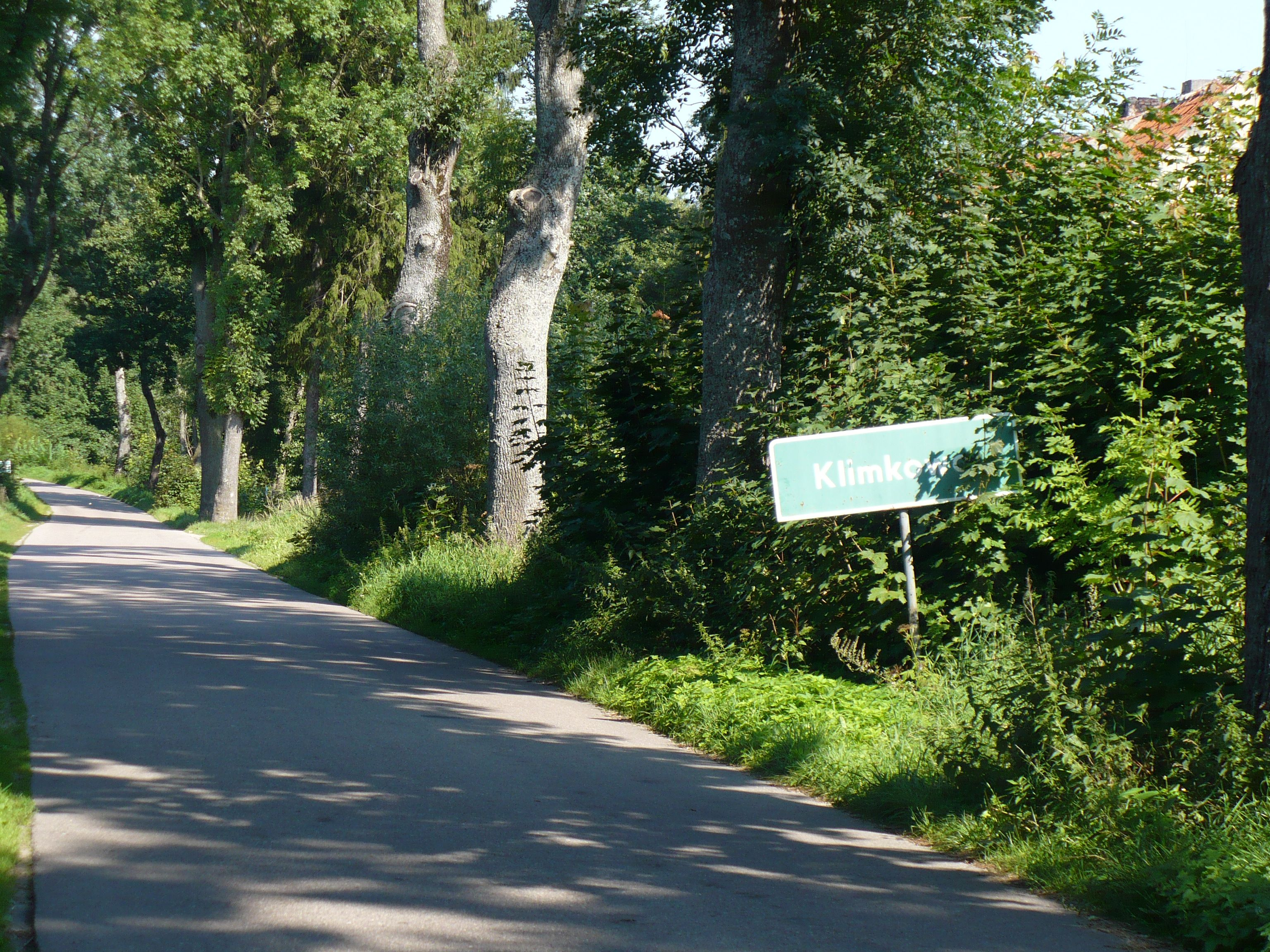
- Road sign in Klimkowo

- Location within Poland
- Coordinates: 53°48′45″N 20°49′15″E
- Country: Poland
- Voivodeship: Warmian-Masurian
- County: Olsztyn
- Gmina: Barczewo

Klimkowo [klʲimˈkɔvɔ] is a village in the administrative district of Gmina Barczewo, within Olsztyn County, Warmian-Masurian Voivodeship, in northern Poland.
