= Kronowo, Olsztyn County =

Kronowo
- Village
- Location within Poland
- Coordinates: 53°53′05″N 20°43′25″E
- Country: Poland
- Voivodeship: Warmian-Masurian
- County: Olsztyn
- Gmina: Barczewo
- Population: 820

Kronowo [krɔˈnɔvɔ] is a village in the administrative district of Gmina Barczewo, within Olsztyn County, Warmian-Masurian Voivodeship, in northern Poland.
