= Gau March of Brandenburg =

- Gau of Nazi Germany
- 1933–1945
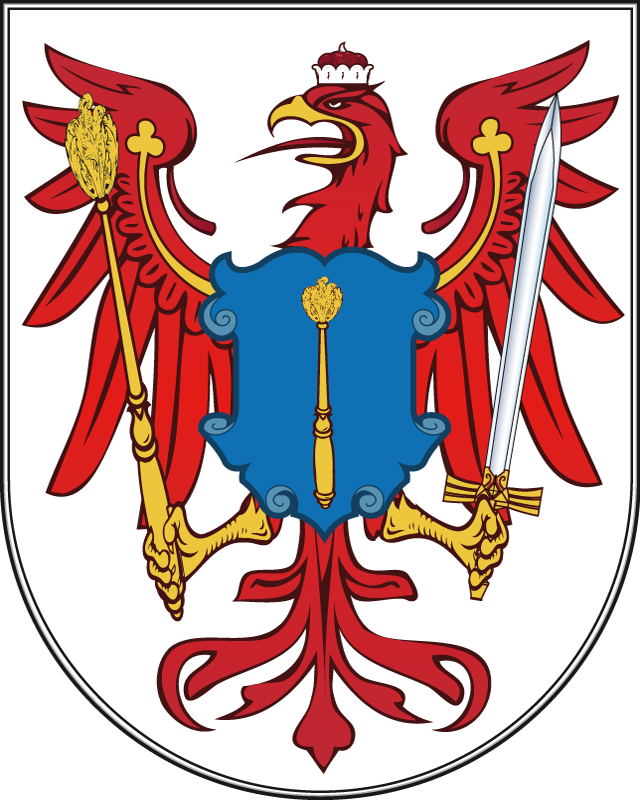
- Flag Coat of arms

- Map of Nazi Germany showing its administrative subdivisions (Gaue and Reichsgaue).
- Capital: Frankfurt an der Oder; Berlin
- Government
- Gauleiter
  - 1933–1936: Wilhelm Kube
  - 1936–1945: Emil Sturtz
- History
  - Establishment: 6 March 1933
  - Disestablishment: 8 May 1945
Preceded by	Succeeded by
Free State of Prussia (1933-1935)	Brandenburg (1945–1952); Polish People's Republic
- Today part of: Germany Poland

The Gau March of Brandenburg (German: Mark Brandenburg) was formed in March 1933 initially under the name Gau Electoral March (German: Kurmark) in Nazi Germany as a district within the Free State of Prussia. In January 1939, Kurmark was renamed March of Brandenburg. The Gau was dissolved in 1945, following Allied Soviet occupation of the area and Germany's formal surrender. After the war, the territory of the former Gau became part of the state of Brandenburg in East Germany except for areas beyond the Oder-Neisse line, which were given to the Polish People's Republic. Most of its territory is now divided between Germany's State of Brandenburg and Poland's Lubusz Voivodeship.

== History ==
The Nazi Gau (plural Gaue) system was originally established in a party conference on 22 May 1926, in order to improve administration of the party structure. From 1933 onward, after the Nazi seizure of power, the Gaue increasingly replaced the German states as administrative subdivisions in Germany.

At the head of each Gau stood a Gauleiter, a position which became increasingly more powerful, especially after the outbreak of the Second World War, with little interference from above. Local Gauleiters often held government positions as well as party ones and were in charge of, among other things, propaganda and surveillance and, from September 1944 onward, the Volkssturm and the defense of the Gau.

The position of Gauleiter in March of Brandenburg was originally held by Wilhelm Kube (1933–36), followed by Emil Sturtz (1936–45).

From early 1939, Germany resumed expulsions of Poles, increased censorship of Polish newspapers, conducted invigilation, arrests and assassinations of Polish leaders, activists, teachers and entrepreneurs, closed various Polish organizations, enterprises and libraries and seized their files and funds. Some Polish activists fled German arrest or conscription to the German army to Poland. During the German invasion of Poland, which started World War II in September 1939, persecution further intensified with mass arrests of Polish leaders, activists, editors, entrepreneurs, etc., who were deported to concentration camps, expulsions and closure of remaining Polish organizations, schools and enterprises.

The Ravensbrück concentration camp and Sachsenhausen concentration camp were located in Gau March of Brandenburg. Ravensbrück was a women's camp. Of the 132,000 prisoners that were sent to the camp 92,000 perished. Of the estimated 200,000 prisoners at Sachsenhausen 30,000 perished. However this figure does not include prisoners that died on the way to the camp or were never registered and killed on arrival, the latter mostly Soviet prisoners of war.

During the war, Germany operated several prisoner-of-war camps, including Stalag III-A, Stalag III-B, Stalag III-C, Stalag III-D, Oflag II-A, Oflag III-A, Oflag III-B, Oflag III-C, Oflag 8 and Oflag 80 for Polish, Belgian, British, Dutch, French, Serbian, Italian, American, Czechoslovak, Soviet, Romanian, Greek, Bulgarian and other Allied POWs with numerous forced labour subcamps in the province.

In early 1945, the death marches of prisoners of various nationalities from various dissolved camps passed through the province.

In the final stages of the war, it was the place of heavy fights, including the Battle of the Seelow Heights and Battle of Berlin, won by the Allied Soviet and Polish armies.
