= Barczewski Dwór =

- Village
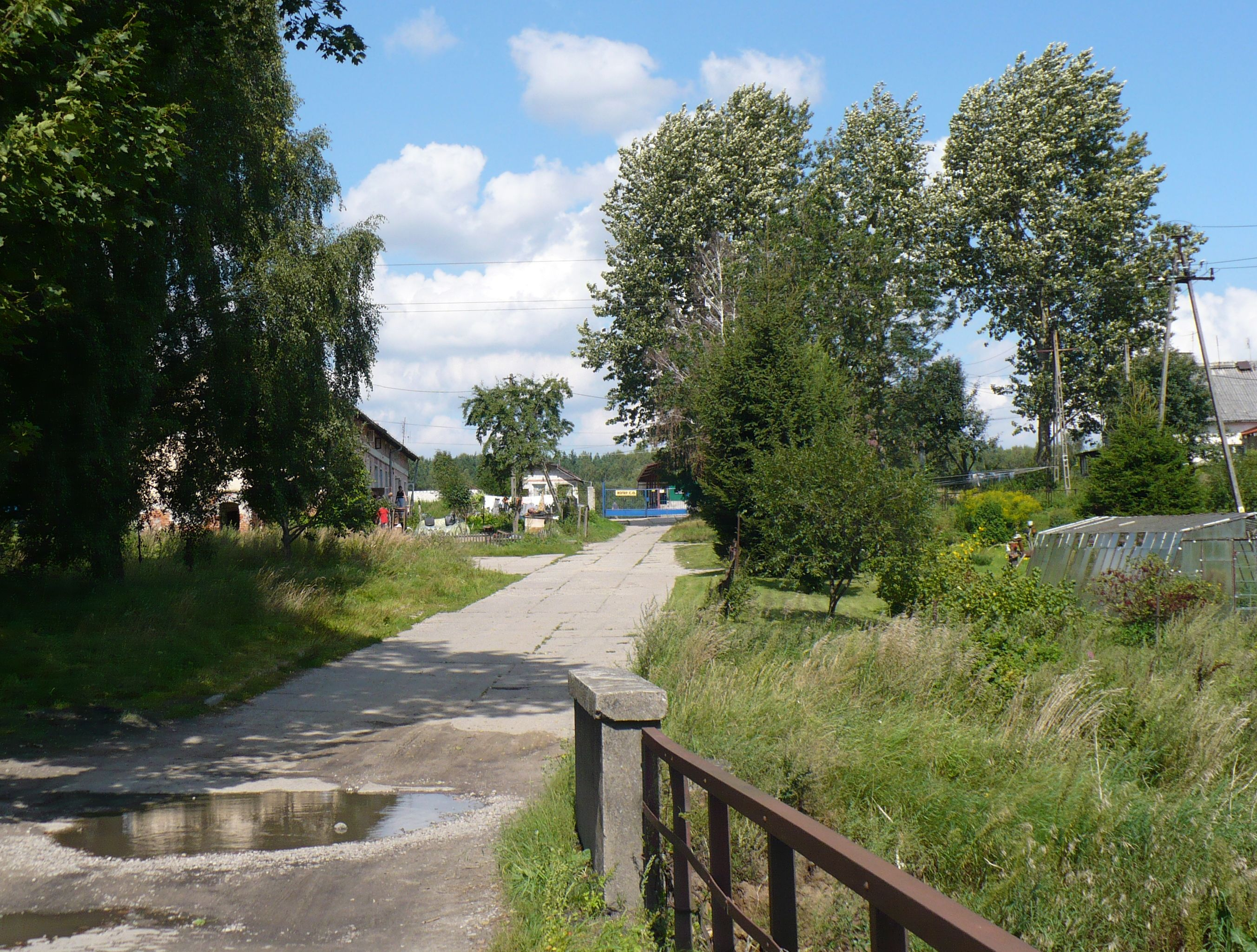

- Location within Poland
- Coordinates: 53°50′33″N 20°41′03″E
- Country: Poland
- Voivodeship: Warmian-Masurian
- County: Olsztyn
- Gmina: Barczewo

Barczewski Dwór [barˈt͡ʂɛfskʲi ˈdvur] is a village in the administrative district of Gmina Barczewo, within Olsztyn County, Warmian-Masurian Voivodeship, in northern Poland.
