= Zalesie, Olsztyn County =

Village in Warmian-Masurian, Poland

Zalesie
- Village
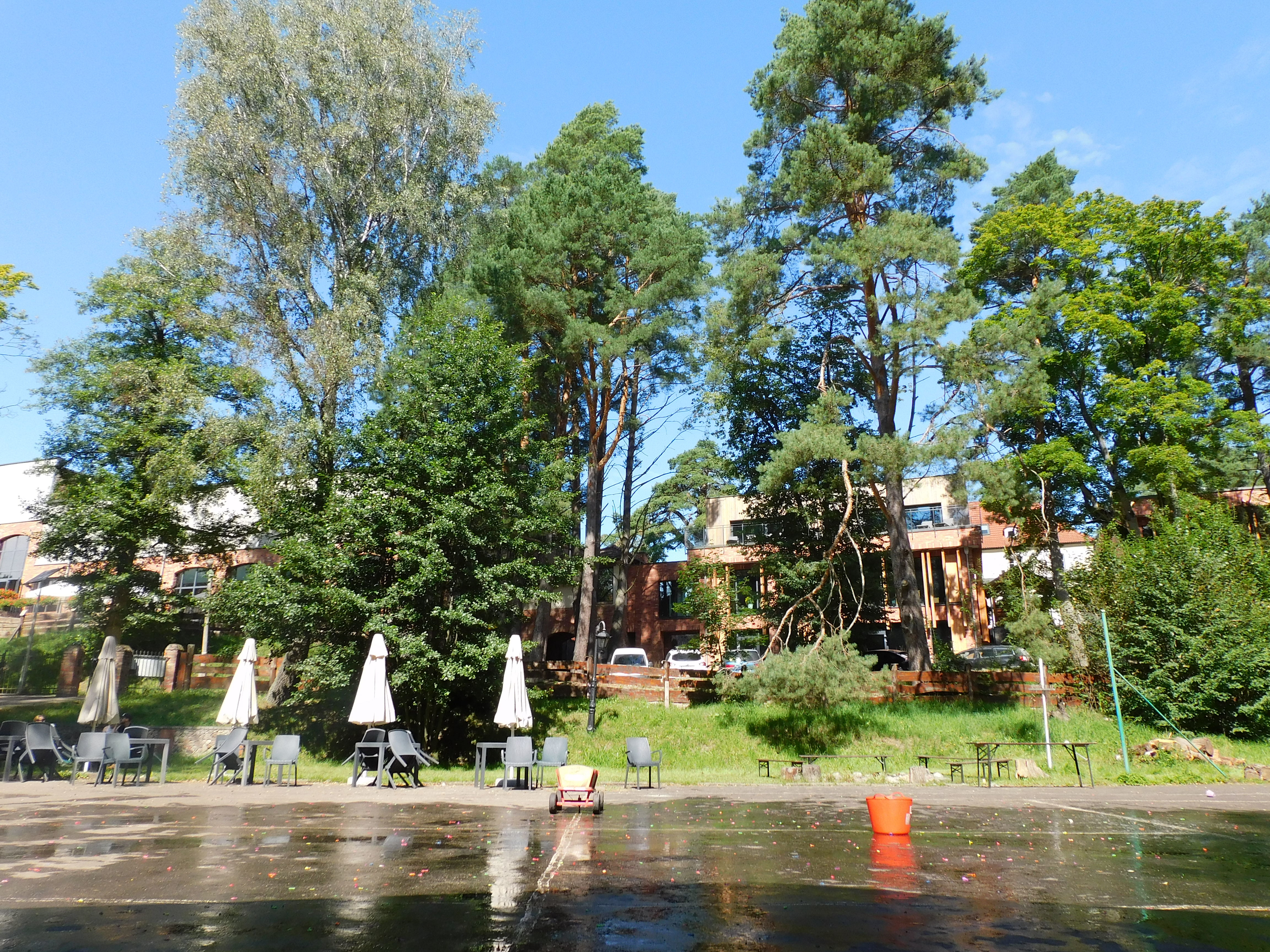
- Zalesie Mazury Holiday Resort.

- Location within Poland
- Coordinates: 53°49′N 20°45′E
- Country: Poland
- Voivodeship: Warmian-Masurian
- County: Olsztyn
- Gmina: Barczewo

Zalesie [zaˈlɛɕɛ] is a village in the administrative district of Gmina Barczewo, within Olsztyn County, Warmian-Masurian Voivodeship, in northern Poland.
