= Dobrąg =

- Settlement
- Location within Poland
- Coordinates: 53°49′N 20°46′E
- Country: Poland
- Voivodeship: Warmian-Masurian
- County: Olsztyn
- Gmina: Barczewo
- Population: 4

Dobrąg [ˈdɔbrɔnk] is a settlement in the administrative district of Gmina Barczewo, within Olsztyn County, Warmian-Masurian Voivodeship, in northern Poland.
