= Ruszajny =

- Village
- Location within Poland
- Coordinates: 53°51′N 20°43′E
- Country: Poland
- Voivodeship: Warmian-Masurian
- County: Olsztyn
- Gmina: Barczewo

Ruszajny [ruˈʂai̯nɨ] is a village in the administrative district of Gmina Barczewo, within Olsztyn County, Warmian-Masurian Voivodeship, in northern Poland.
