= Zarak, Iran =

Zarak زرك
- Village
- Location within Iran
- Coordinates: 32°45′15″N 49°40′41″E
- Country: Iran
- Province: Chaharmahal and Bakhtiari
- County: Kuhrang
- Bakhsh: Central
- Rural District: Miankuh-e Moguyi

Population (2006)
  - Total: 107
- Time zone: UTC+3:30 (IRST)
  - Summer (DST): UTC+4:30 (IRDT)

Zarak (Persian: زرك; also known as Zarak Rūstā) is a village in Miankuh-e Moguyi Rural District, in the Central District of Kuhrang County, Chaharmahal and Bakhtiari Province, Iran. At the 2006 census, its population was 107, in 16 families. The village is populated by Lurs.
