= Gmina Barczewo =

Gmina Barczewo Barczewo Commune
- Gmina
- Coat of arms
- Interactive map of Gmina Barczewo
- Coordinates (Barczewo): 53°50′N 20°41′E
- Country: Poland
- Voivodeship: Warmian-Masurian
- County: Olsztyn County
- Seat: Barczewo

Area
  - Total: 319.85 km^{2} (123.49 sq mi)

Population (2006)
  - Total: 16,525
  - Density: 51.665/km^{2} (133.81/sq mi)
  - Urban: 7,401
  - Rural: 9,124
- Website: http://www.barczewo.pl/

Gmina Barczewo is an urban-rural gmina (administrative district) in Olsztyn County, Warmian-Masurian Voivodeship, in northern Poland. Its seat is the town of Barczewo, which lies approximately 14 kilometres (9 mi) north-east of the regional capital Olsztyn.

The gmina covers an area of 319.85 square kilometres (123.5 sq mi), and as of 2006 its total population is 16,525, of which the population of Barczewo is 7,401, and the population of the rural part of the gmina is 9,124.

== Villages ==
Apart from the town of Barczewo, Gmina Barczewo contains the villages and settlements of Barczewko, Barczewski Dwór, Bark, Bartołty Małe, Bartołty Wielkie, Biedowo, Bogdany, Czerwony Bór, Dąbrówka Mała, Dadaj, Dobrąg, Gaj, Jedzbark, Kaplityny, Kierzbuń, Kierźliny, Klimkowo, Klucznik, Kołaki, Koronowo, Kromerowo, Kronówko, Kronowo, Krupoliny, Lamkówko, Lamkowo, Łapka, Łęgajny, Leszno, Leszno Małe, Maruny, Mokiny, Niedźwiedź, Nikielkowo, Odryty, Orzechówko, Próle, Radosty, Ramsówko, Ramsowo, Rejczuchy, Ruszajny, Rycybałt, Sapunki, Sapuny, Skajboty, Stare Włóki, Studzianek, Szynowo, Tęguty, Tumiany, Wipsowo, Wójtowo, Wrocikowo, Zalesie and Żarek.

== Neighbouring gminas ==
Gmina Barczewo is bordered by the city of Olsztyn and by the gminas of Biskupiec, Dywity, Dźwierzuty, Jeziorany and Purda.
