= Lapka (surname) =

- Mark Lapka, American politician
- Myron Lapka (1956–2025), American football player
- Ted Lapka (1920–2011), American football player
