= Nikielkowo =

- Village
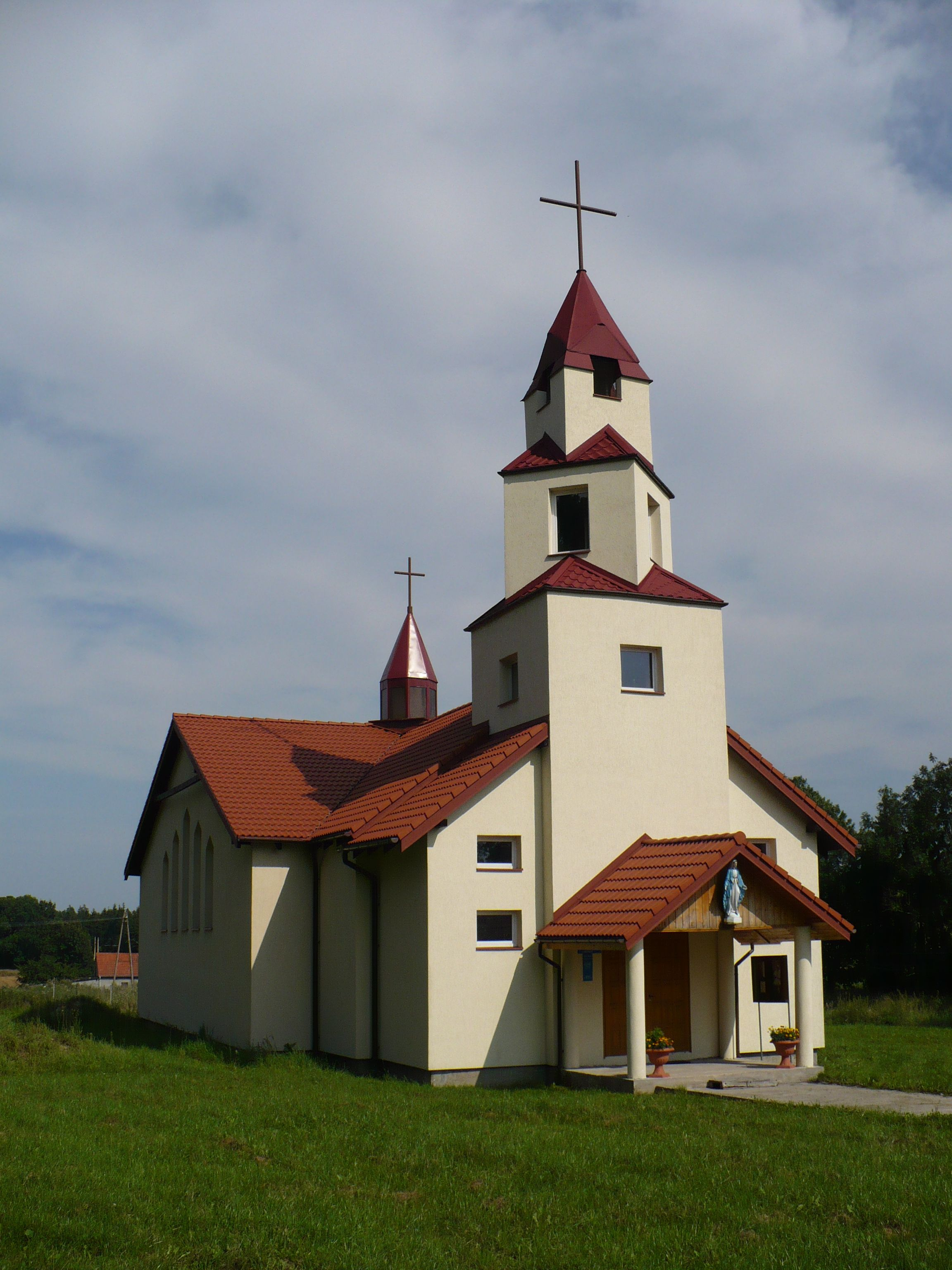
- Church

- Location within Poland
- Coordinates: 53°48′20″N 20°34′01″E
- Country: Poland
- Voivodeship: Warmian-Masurian
- County: Olsztyn
- Gmina: Barczewo

Nikielkowo [ɲikʲɛlˈkɔvɔ] is a village in the administrative district of Gmina Barczewo, within Olsztyn County, Warmian-Masurian Voivodeship, in northern Poland.

A village near Olsztyn, located between Olsztyn, Wójtowo, and Łęgajny, featuring a church (a filial church), a sports field, and two playgrounds. The manor park has been preserved and restored. The area of the village administrative unit is 582 hectares. Since 2010, the Association for the Development of Nikielkowo "Stowarzyszenie na rzecz rozwoju wsi Nikilekowo” and the local Rural Women’s Circle have been active.

Playground in Nikielkowo

The village also has a railway stop: Nikielkowo.
