= Kierźliny =

- Village
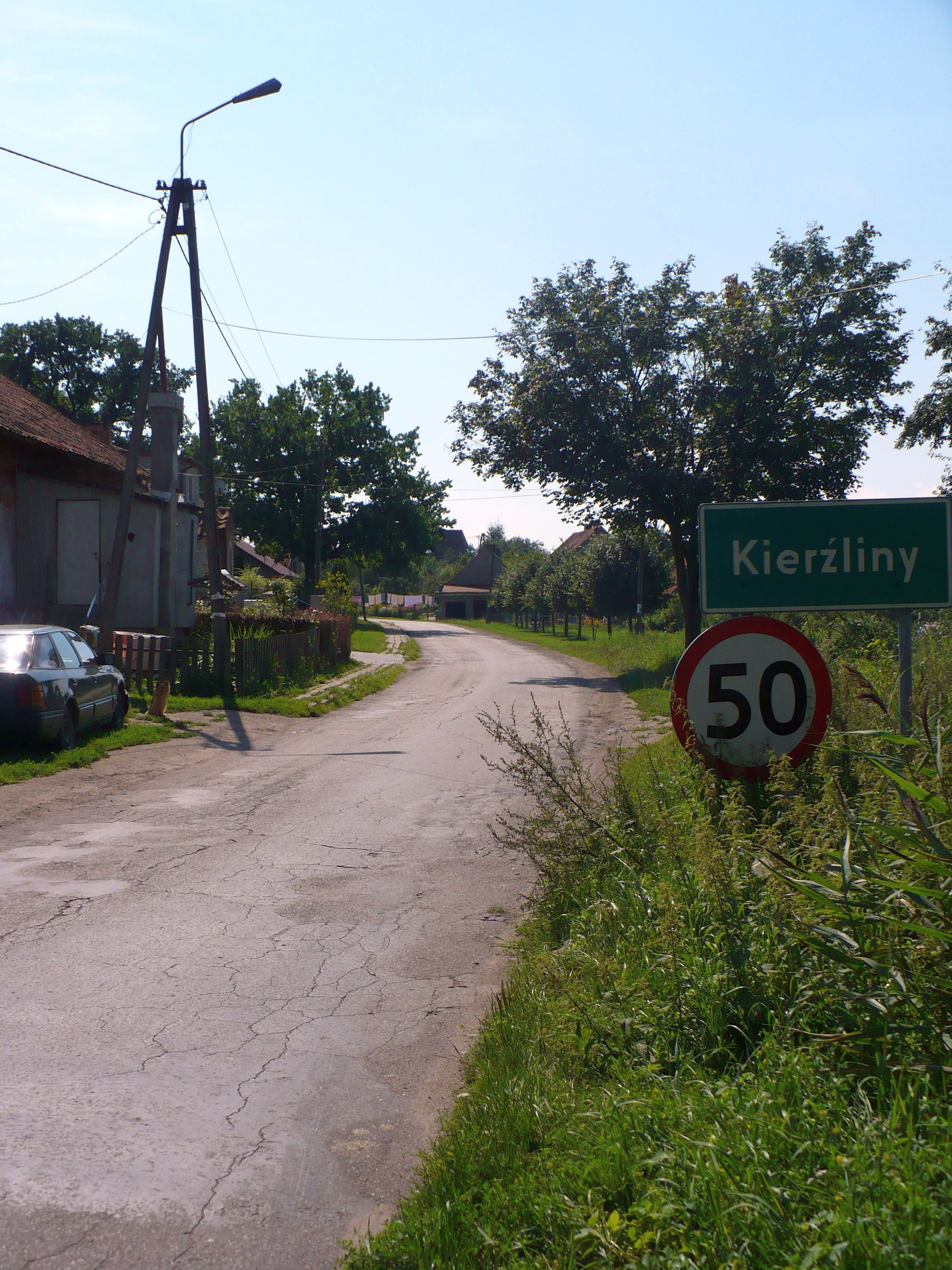
- Road sign in Kierźliny

- Location within Poland
- Coordinates: 53°48′22″N 20°44′46″E
- Country: Poland
- Voivodeship: Warmian-Masurian
- County: Olsztyn
- Gmina: Barczewo

Kierźliny [kʲɛrˈʑlʲinɨ] is a village in the administrative district of Gmina Barczewo, within Olsztyn County, Warmian-Masurian Voivodeship, in northern Poland.
