= Barczewko =

- Village
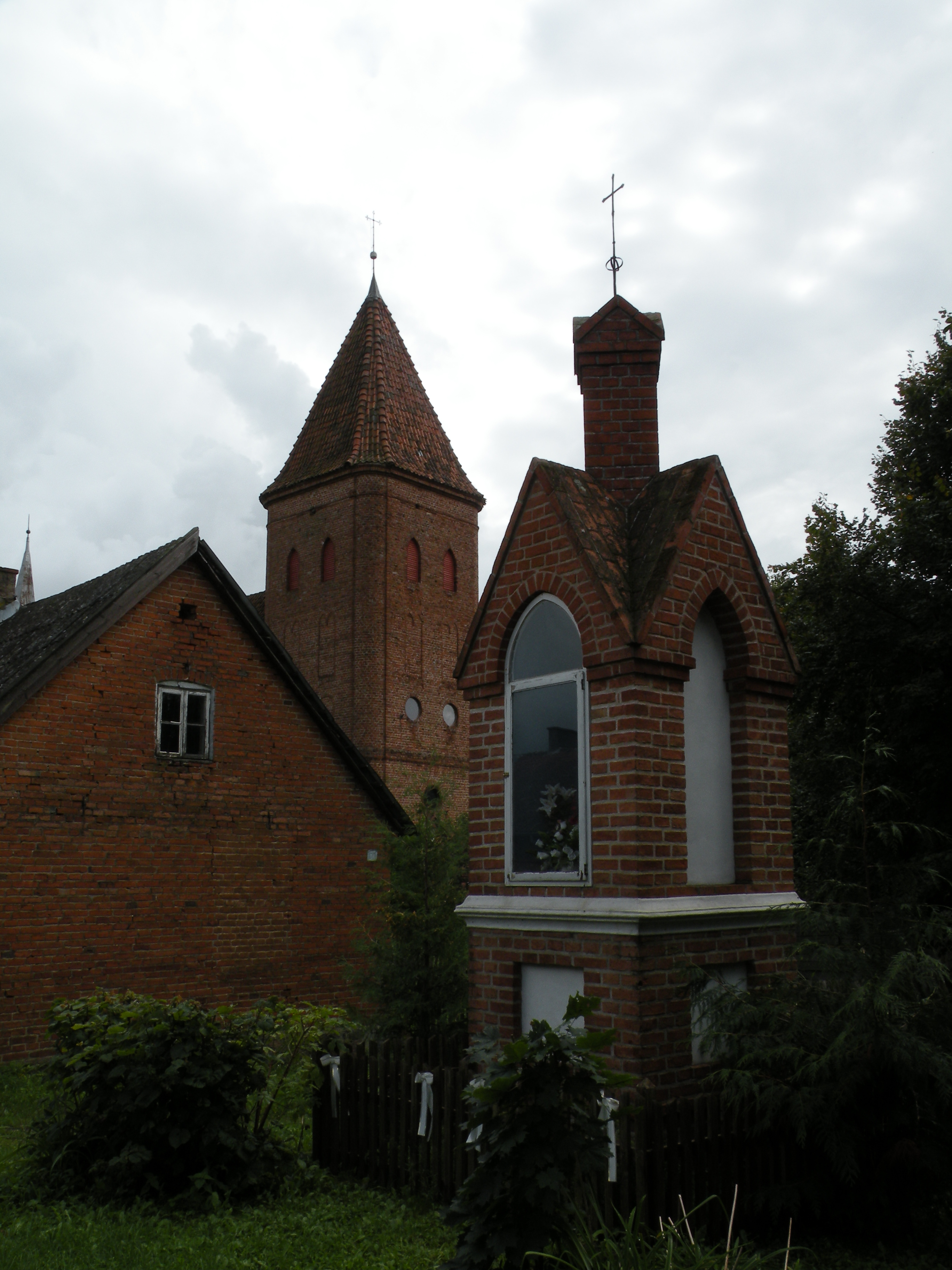
- Old wayside shrine with the Saint Lawrence church in the background

- Location within Poland
- Coordinates: 53°51′0″N 20°35′17″E
- Country: Poland
- Voivodeship: Warmian-Masurian
- County: Olsztyn
- Gmina: Barczewo
- Population: 1,050
- Time zone: UTC+1 (CET)
  - Summer (DST): UTC+2 (CEST)
- Vehicle registration: NOL

Barczewko [barˈt͡ʂɛfkɔ] is a village in the administrative district of Gmina Barczewo, within Olsztyn County, Warmian-Masurian Voivodeship, in northern Poland. It is situated on the northern shore of Lake Wadąg in the historic region of Warmia.

== History ==
Barczewko was established in the 1320s by vogt Friedrich von Liebenzelle. It had an associated castle, but its location has not been established. The settlement was established on a promontory to northeast of Lake Wadag. Bounded by ditches and earthen ramparts, the site of the medieval village was roughly oval and measured 220 by 160 metres (720 by 520 ft) along its axes. Barczewko was a planned settlement, with organised streets, a central square, a church and cemetery, and a bathhouse. The main construction material used at Barczewko was timber, with little use of stone or brick. The village is mentioned in written sources for the first time on 26 December 1329.

The Grand Duchy of Lithuania and the Order of Teutonic Knights were frequently in conflict with each other in the 14th century with 138 raids conducted against each other between 1345 and 1382. The 14th-century chronicler Wigand von Marburg recorded that in 1354 "Kęstutis and Algirdas, along with their nobles etc., rushed to Wartenberg in the land of Gunelauken, which they destroyed in a hostile manner with fire, etc. and nobody escaped their hands". Kęstutis and Algirdas were brothers and joint Grand Dukes of Lithuania. The destruction of Barczewko and its population was typical of the conflict between the two parties. Archaeological evidence indicates the destruction of Barczewko was a surprise attack, with no signs of a siege. Extensive burning was found, along with bodies amongst the remains of the buildings. The fire may have been deliberately spread across the town as the buildings were not densely arranged.

The village was later rebuilt but further to the east of the original location. The village church dates from 1582. It formed part of the Kingdom of Poland until it was annexed by Prussia in the First Partition of Poland in 1772. In the late 19th century, it had a population of 650, solely Polish by nationality. In 1920, the Germans attacked and disrupted Polish rallies held in the village.
