= Łapka =

- Village
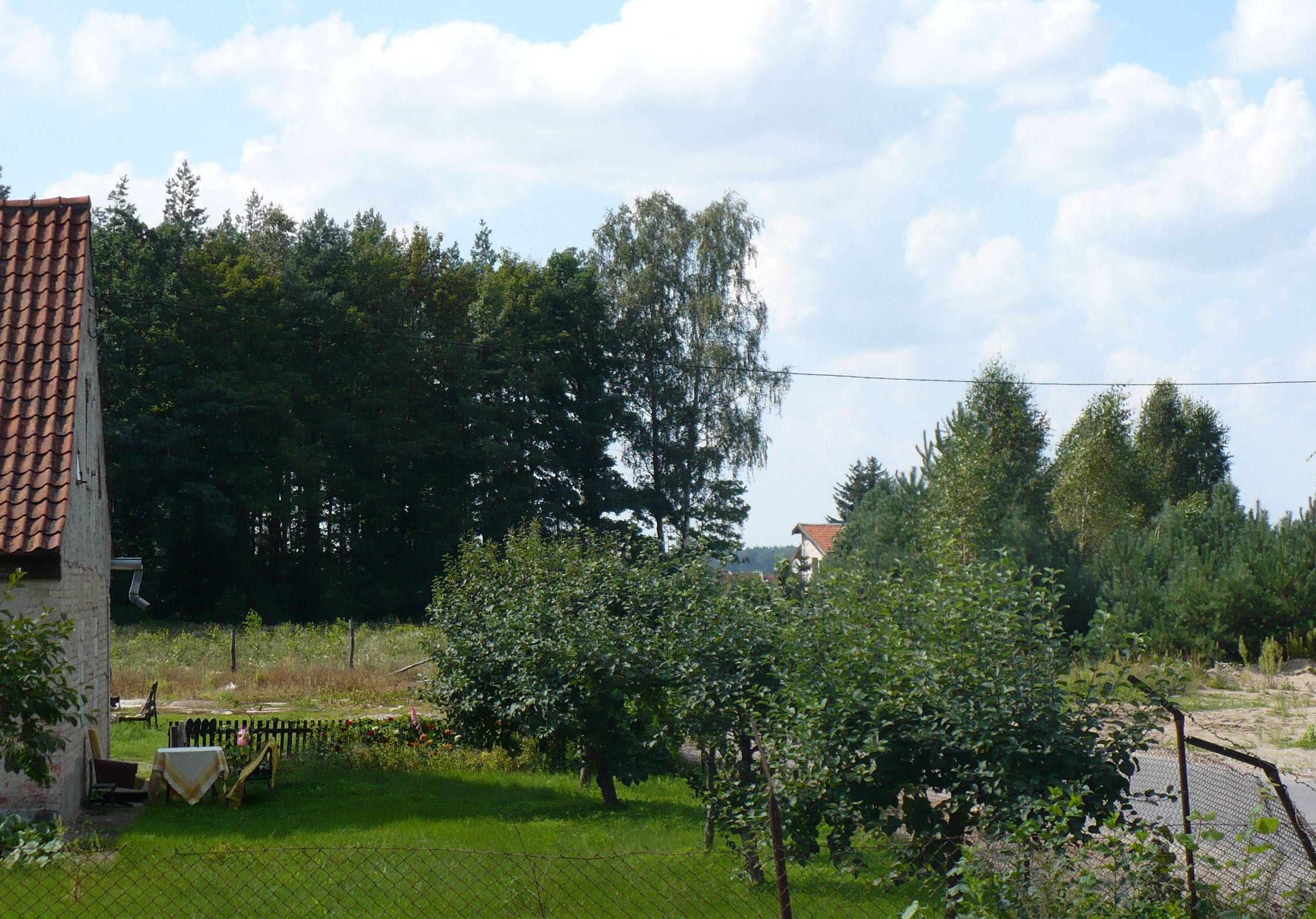

- Location within Poland
- Coordinates: 53°52′06″N 20°42′41″E
- Country: Poland
- Voivodeship: Warmian-Masurian
- County: Olsztyn
- Gmina: Barczewo
- Time zone: UTC+1 (CET)
  - Summer (DST): UTC+2 (CEST)
- Area code: (+48) 89
- ISO 3166 code: POL

Łapka [ˈwapka] is a village in the administrative district of Gmina Barczewo, within Olsztyn County, Warmian-Masurian Voivodeship, in northern Poland.
