= Zarak-e Tang Khas =

Zarak-e Tang Khas زرك تنگ خاص
- Village
- Country: Iran
- Province: Fars
- County: Mamasani
- Bakhsh: Central
- Rural District: Javid-e Mahuri

Population (2006)
  - Total: 54
- Time zone: UTC+3:30 (IRST)
  - Summer (DST): UTC+4:30 (IRDT)

Zarak-e Tang Khas (Persian: زرك تنگ خاص, also Romanized as Zarak-e Tang Khāş) is a village in Javid-e Mahuri Rural District, in the Central District of Mamasani County, Fars province, Iran. At the 2006 census, its population was 54, in 13 families.
