= Warkały, Olsztyn County =

Warkały
- Village
- Location within Poland
- Coordinates: 53°49′N 20°20′E
- Country: Poland
- Voivodeship: Warmian-Masurian
- County: Olsztyn
- Gmina: Jonkowo
- Population: 350

Warkały [varˈkawɨ] is a village in the administrative district of Gmina Jonkowo, within Olsztyn County, Warmian-Masurian Voivodeship, in northern Poland.
