= Unieszewo =

- Village
- Location within Poland
- Coordinates: 53°42′58″N 20°18′38″E
- Country: Poland
- Voivodeship: Warmian-Masurian
- County: Olsztyn
- Gmina: Gietrzwałd
- Population: 906

Unieszewo [uɲɛˈʂɛvɔ] is a village in the administrative district of Gmina Gietrzwałd, within Olsztyn County, Warmian-Masurian Voivodeship, in northern Poland.
