= Wójtowo, Gmina Barczewo =

Wójtowo
- Village
- Location within Poland
- Coordinates: 53°47′22″N 20°35′52″E
- Country: Poland
- Voivodeship: Warmian-Masurian
- County: Olsztyn
- Gmina: Barczewo
- Population (approx.): 1,000
- Website: http://www.wojtowo.pl

Wójtowo [vui̯ˈtɔvɔ] is a village in the administrative district of Gmina Barczewo, within Olsztyn County, Warmian-Masurian Voivodeship, in northern Poland.
