= Zalbki =

- Village
- Location within Poland
- Coordinates: 53°49′N 20°33′E
- Country: Poland
- Voivodeship: Warmian-Masurian
- County: Olsztyn
- Gmina: Dywity

Zalbki [ˈzalpki] is a village in the administrative district of Gmina Dywity, within Olsztyn County, Warmian-Masurian Voivodeship, in northern Poland.
