= Próle =

- Village
- Location within Poland
- Coordinates: 53°55′N 20°46′E
- Country: Poland
- Voivodeship: Warmian-Masurian
- County: Olsztyn
- Gmina: Barczewo

Próle [ˈprulɛ] is a village in the administrative district of Gmina Barczewo, within Olsztyn County, Warmian-Masurian Voivodeship, in northern Poland.
