= Tuławki =

- Village
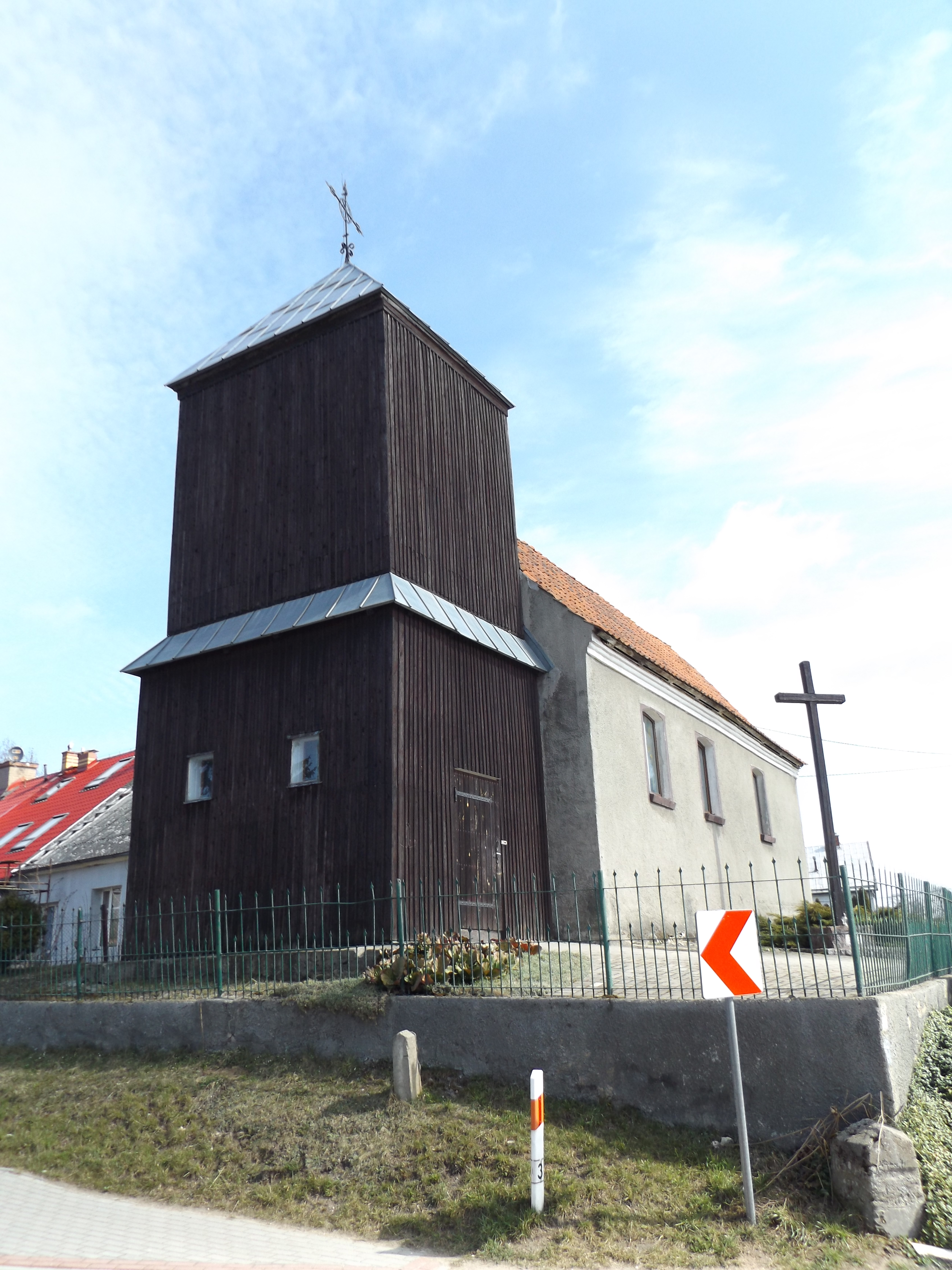
- Saint Michael Archangel church in Tuławki

- Location within Poland
- Coordinates: 53°54′N 20°35′E
- Country: Poland
- Voivodeship: Warmian-Masurian
- County: Olsztyn
- Gmina: Dywity
- Population: 511
- Time zone: UTC+1 (CET)
  - Summer (DST): UTC+2 (CEST)
- Postal code: 11-001
- Area code: +48 89
- Vehicle registration: NOL

Tuławki [tuˈwafki] is a village in the administrative district of Gmina Dywity, within Olsztyn County, Warmian-Masurian Voivodeship, in northern Poland. It is located within the historic region of Warmia

== History ==
The village dates back to the Middle Ages. It was located in 1369 by Bishop Jan Stryprock. In the 15th century, the village suffered as a result of the Polish-Teutonic wars. Bishop Jan Dantyszek issued a new location privilege in 1538. A school was established in Tuławki in the 18th century. The historic Saint Michael Archangel church, consecrated in the 18th century by Polish bishop and poet Ignacy Krasicki, is located in the village.
