= Węgajty =

- Village
- Location within Poland
- Coordinates: 53°49′15″N 20°16′39″E
- Country: Poland
- Voivodeship: Warmian-Masurian
- County: Olsztyn
- Gmina: Jonkowo

Węgajty [vɛnˈɡai̯tɨ] is a village in the administrative district of Gmina Jonkowo, within Olsztyn County, Warmian-Masurian Voivodeship, in northern Poland.

The village is home to the Village Theatre of Węgajty (Teatr Wiejski Węgajty), an international theatre group which stages an annual international theatre festival as well as a number of ethnographic performance projects.
