= Klebark Wielki =

- Village
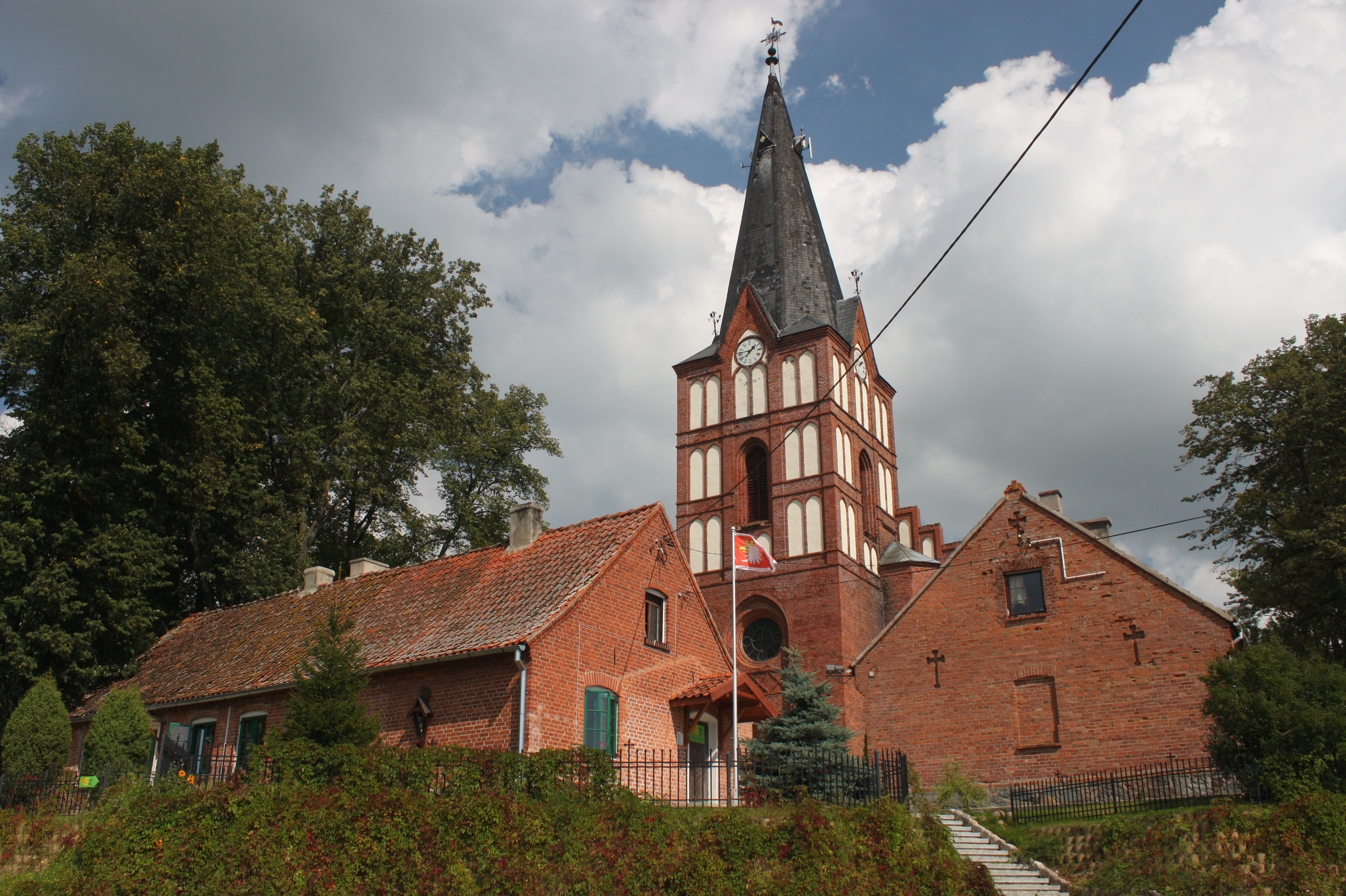
- Holy Cross church and rectory in Klebark Wielki

- Location within Poland
- Coordinates: 53°45′N 20°36′E
- Country: Poland
- Voivodeship: Warmian-Masurian
- County: Olsztyn
- Gmina: Purda
- Population (2011): 501
- Time zone: UTC+1 (CET)
  - Summer (DST): UTC+2 (CEST)
- Area code: +48 89
- Vehicle registration: NOL

Klebark Wielki (Polish pronunciation: [ˈklɛbark ˈfjɛlkʲi]) is a village in the administrative district of Gmina Purda, within Olsztyn County, Warmian-Masurian Voivodeship, in northern Poland. It is located in Warmia.

Klebark Wielki's landmark is the Holy Cross church. There's also an Armenian khachkar commemorating the Armenian genocide.

== History ==
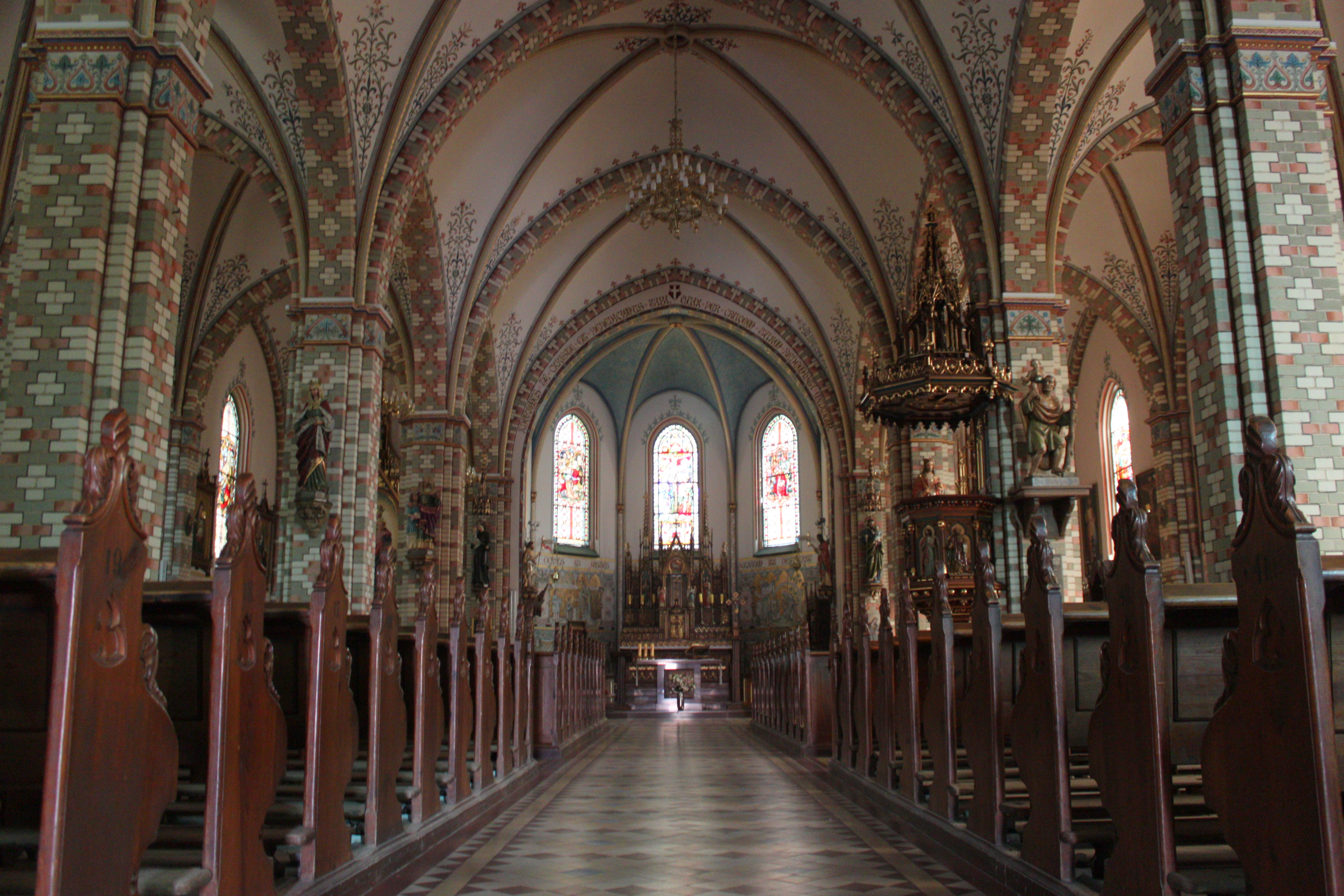
Interior of the Holy Cross church

The village of Klebark dates back to the 14th century and was initially populated with Baltic Prussians and by Poles since the late 14th century. The first Catholic church was built in the early 15th century. The village was devastated by the Teutonic Knights during the Thirteen Years' War in 1455. From 1464 it was part of the Polish Crown. After the destruction and depopulation of the village during the last Polish–Teutonic War (1519–1521), Nicolaus Copernicus, who resided in nearby Olsztyn, led a repopulation campaign, attracting Polish settlers from other places. Then the village was organized in two parts: Klebark Wielki and Klebark Mały. The division of the village was sanctioned by the Warmian chapter in 1587 and it has been preserved to this day.

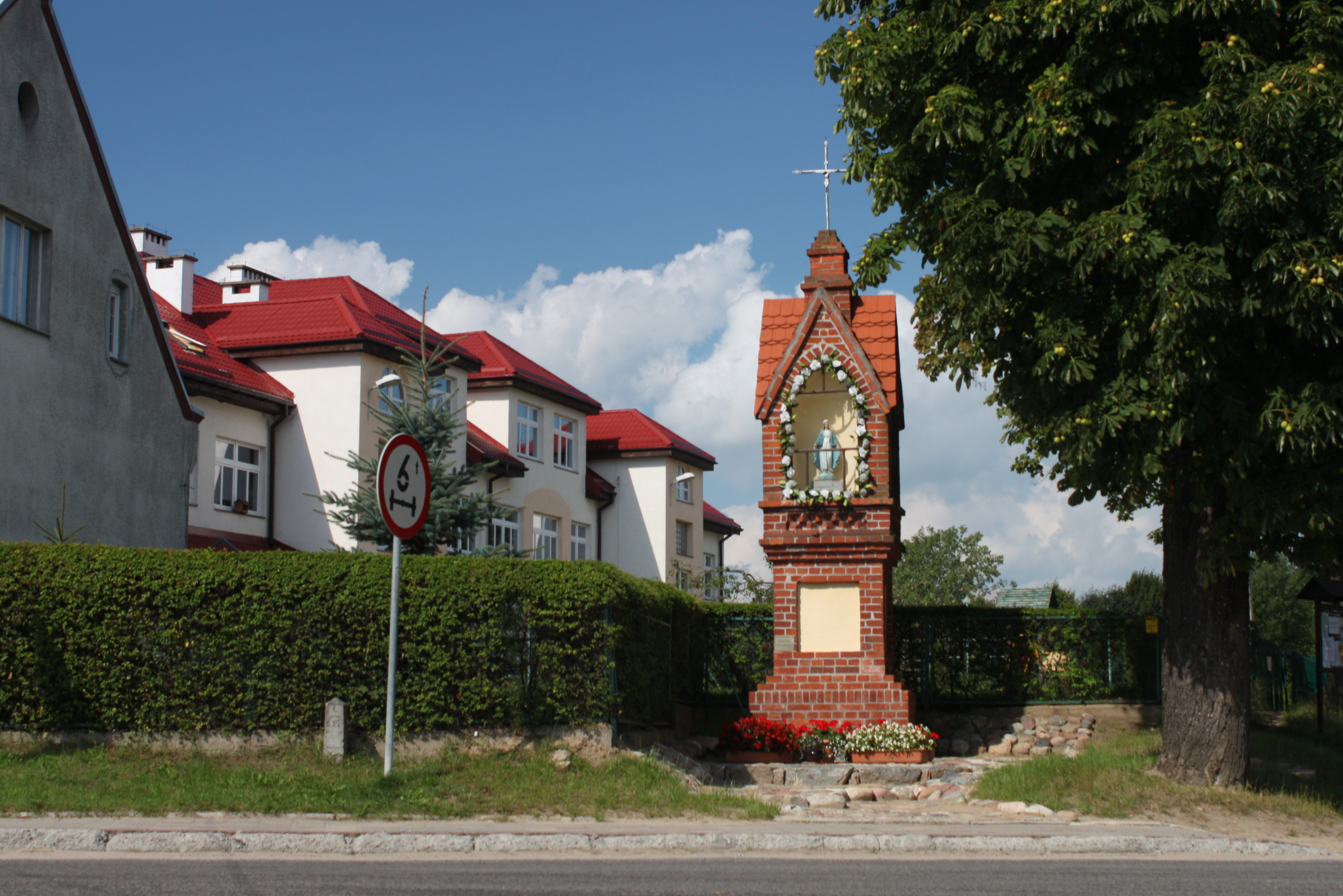
Warmian old wayside shrine with the school in the background

Again destroyed and depopulated during the Swedish invasion of Poland in 1656, the village was soon again repopulated with Polish settlers. After the Partitions of Poland it fell to Prussia. The village was a strong center of Polish resistance to attempts at Germanisation, forced by the Prussian and later German administration. In 1863, local priest Juliusz Grzymała hid Polish insurgents in the parish, from 1872 the parish brought Polish newspapers to the village. In 1881 a Polish library was created, which was to be a counterweight to the official German school. Near the end of World War II, in January 1945 Soviet soldiers tortured and murdered the local Polish parish priest Paweł Chmielewski. After the war Klebark Wielki was reintegrated with Poland.

== Notable people ==
- Jan Liszewski (1852–1894), Polish teacher, publicist, activist, founder of the Gazeta Olsztyńska newspaper, was born in the village
