= Tomaszkowo =

- Village
- Location within Poland
- Coordinates: 53°43′N 20°25′E
- Country: Poland
- Voivodeship: Warmian-Masurian
- County: Olsztyn
- Gmina: Stawiguda
- Population (2011): 541
- Time zone: UTC+1 (CET)
  - Summer (DST): UTC+2 (CEST)
- Area code: +48 89
- Vehicle registration: NOL

Tomaszkowo [tɔmaʂˈkɔvɔ] is a village in the administrative district of Gmina Stawiguda, within Olsztyn County, Warmian-Masurian Voivodeship, in northern Poland. It is located in Warmia.

== Notable people ==
- Jan Boenigk (1903–1982), Polish teacher and publicist in Warmia, imprisoned by the Germans in the Sachsenhausen concentration camp during World War II, was born in the village
- Edward Turowski (1904–1972), member of the Sejm, Polish teacher in Warmia, imprisoned by the Germans in the Sachsenhausen concentration camp during World War II, was born and died in the village
