= Klebark Mały =

- Village
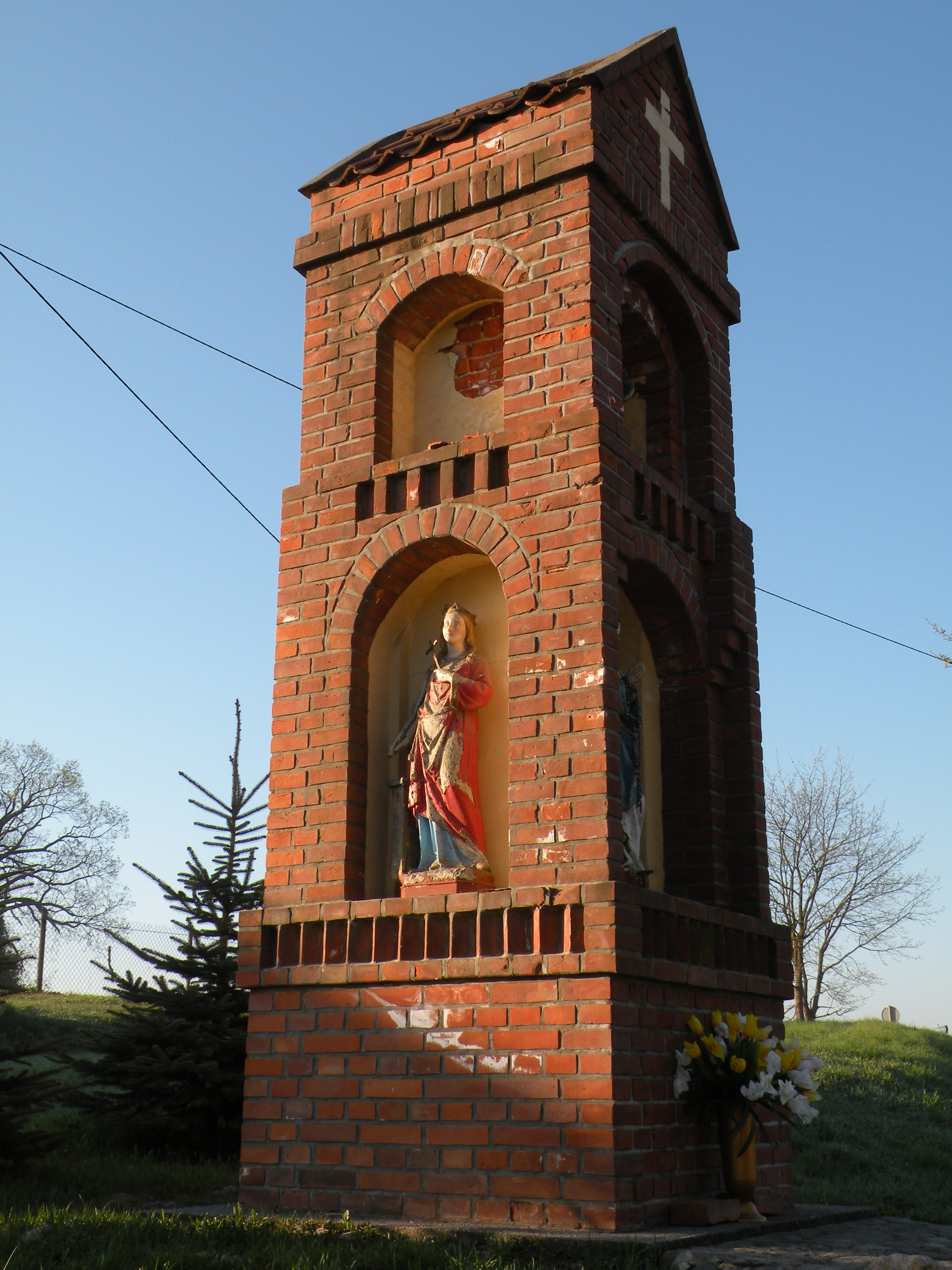
- Warmian wayside shrine in Klebark Mały

- Location within Poland
- Coordinates: 53°47′N 20°34′E
- Country: Poland
- Voivodeship: Warmian-Masurian
- County: Olsztyn
- Gmina: Purda
- Population (2011): 464
- Time zone: UTC+1 (CET)
  - Summer (DST): UTC+2 (CEST)
- Area code: +48 89
- Vehicle registration: NOL

Klebark Mały [ˈklɛbark ˈmawɨ] is a village in the administrative district of Gmina Purda in Olsztyn County, Warmian-Masurian Voivodeship, in northern Poland. It is in the region of Warmia.

== History ==
The village of Klebark dates back to the 14th century and was initially populated with Baltic Prussians and by Poles since the late 14th century. It was devastated by the Teutonic Knights during the Thirteen Years' War in 1455.

From 1464, it was part of the Polish Crown. After the destruction and depopulation of the village during the last Polish–Teutonic War (1519–1521), Nicolaus Copernicus, who resided in nearby Olsztyn, led a repopulation campaign, attracting Polish settlers from other places. Then the village was organized in two parts: Klebark Wielki and Klebark Mały.

The division of the village was sanctioned by the Warmian chapter in 1587 and it has been preserved to this day. Again destroyed and depopulated during the Swedish invasion of Poland in 1656, the villages were soon again repopulated with Polish settlers. After the Partitions of Poland they fell to Prussia. The Prussian authorities conducted a Germanisation action, which, however, did not bring significant results.
