= Wipsowo =

- Village
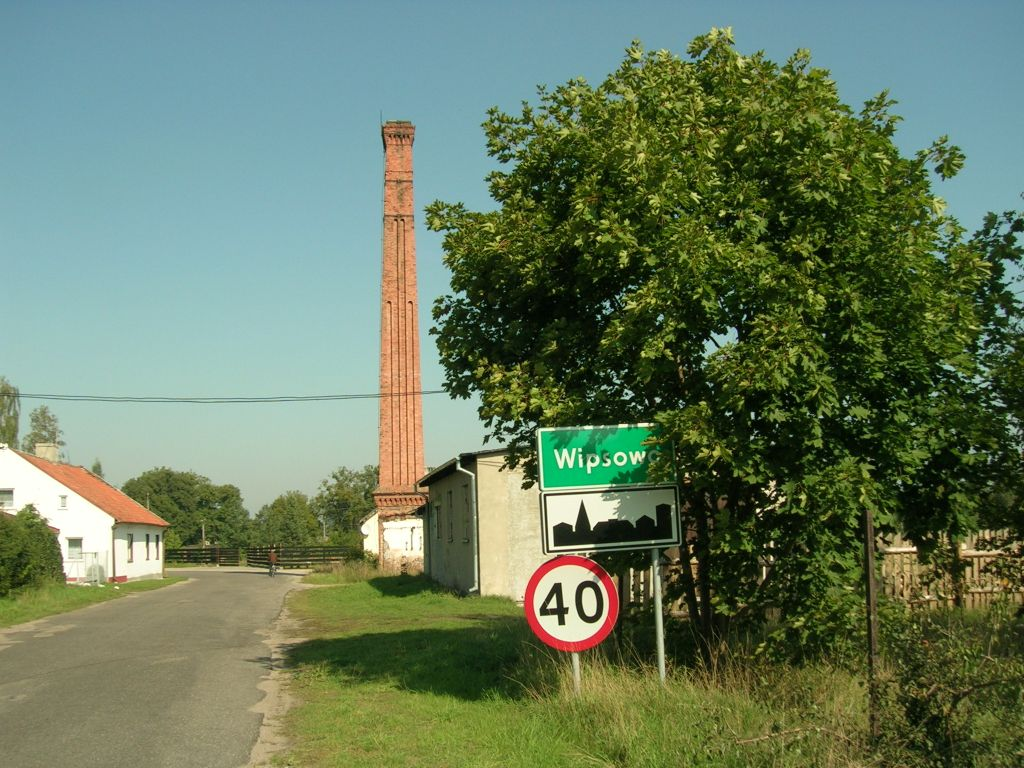

- Location within Poland
- Coordinates: 53°54′N 20°48′E
- Country: Poland
- Voivodeship: Warmian-Masurian
- County: Olsztyn
- Gmina: Barczewo
- Population: 764

Wipsowo [vʲipˈsɔvɔ] is a village in the administrative district of Gmina Barczewo, within Olsztyn County, Warmian-Masurian Voivodeship, in northern Poland.

== Notable residents ==
- Emil Stürtz (1892-1945), Nazi politician
