= Barczewo =

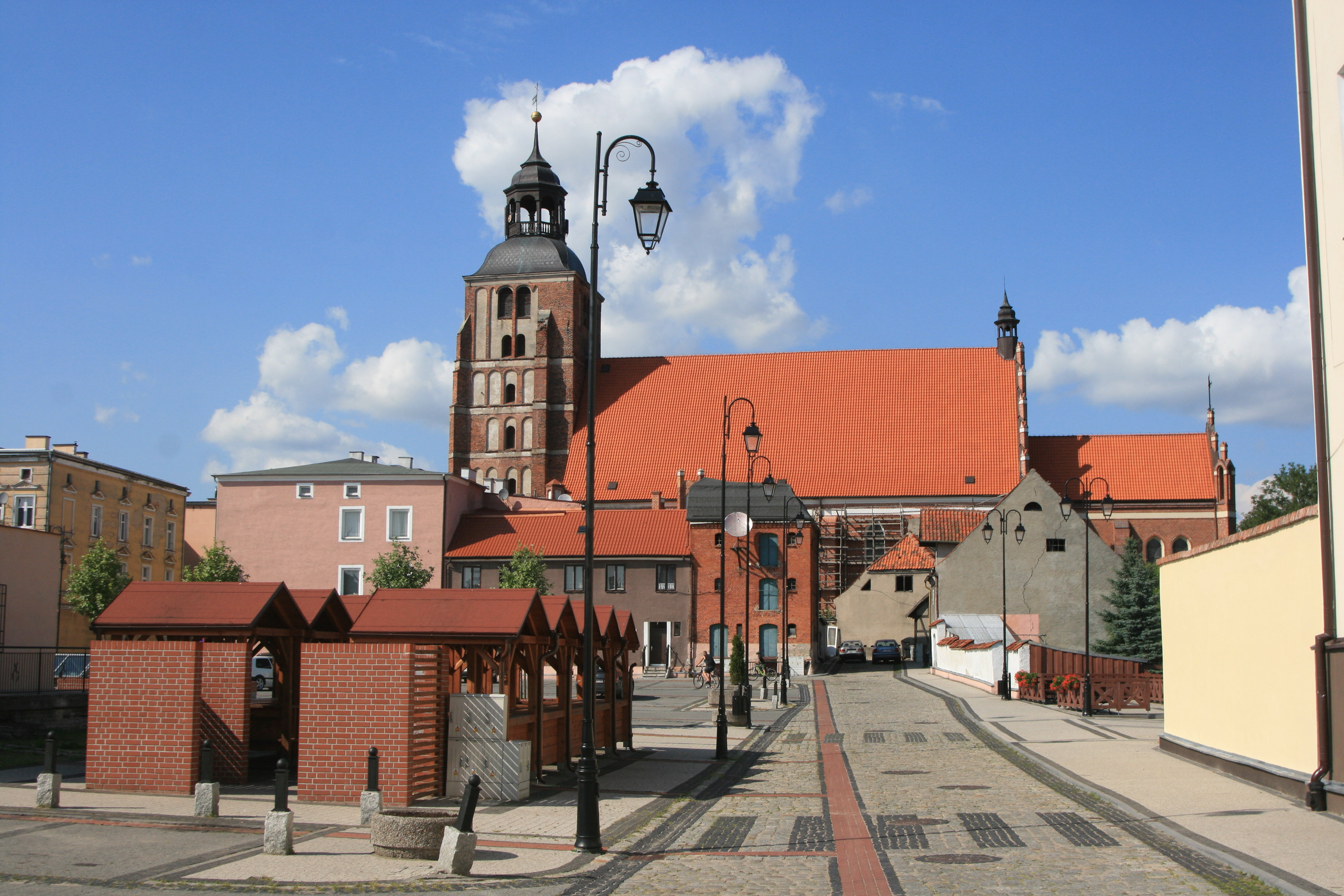
- Old Town and St. Anne's Church

- Coat of arms

- Location within Poland
- Coordinates: 53°50′N 20°41′E
- Country: Poland
- Voivodeship: Warmian-Masurian
- County: Olsztyn
- Gmina: Barczewo
- Town rights: 1364

Government
  - Mayor: Andrzej Maciejewski

Area
  - Total: 4.58 km^{2} (1.77 sq mi)
- Elevation: 146 m (479 ft)

Population (31 December 2021)
  - Total: 7,483
  - Density: 1,634/km^{2} (4,230/sq mi)
- Time zone: UTC+1 (CET)
  - Summer (DST): UTC+2 (CEST)
- Postal code: 11-010
- Area code: +48 89
- Car plates: NOL
- Primary airport: Olsztyn-Mazury Airport
- Website: http://www.barczewo.pl

Barczewo [barˈt͡ʂɛvɔ] (until 1946 Wartembork; German: Wartenburg in Ostpreußen) is a town in Olsztyn County, Warmian-Masurian Voivodeship, in northern Poland. As of December 2021, the town has a population of 7,483.

== Name ==
The German name of the town ("Wartenburg") has its origins from the town of Wartenburg (Elbe). In Polish the town was known historically mostly as Wartembork, but also as Wartenberg, Wartenbergk, Wathberg, Bartenburg, Warperc, Wasperc, Wartbór or Wartbórz.

In the aftermath of World War II, the town was transferred from Germany once again to Poland. The Commission for the Determination of Place Names decided to change the town's name. It was briefly named Nowowiejsk, after local composer Feliks Nowowiejski, in September 1946. In December that year the Commission settled on another name, Barczewo, honouring Polish national activist who fought against Prussian oppression of Poles in Warmia, Walenty Barczewski (1865–1928).

== History ==
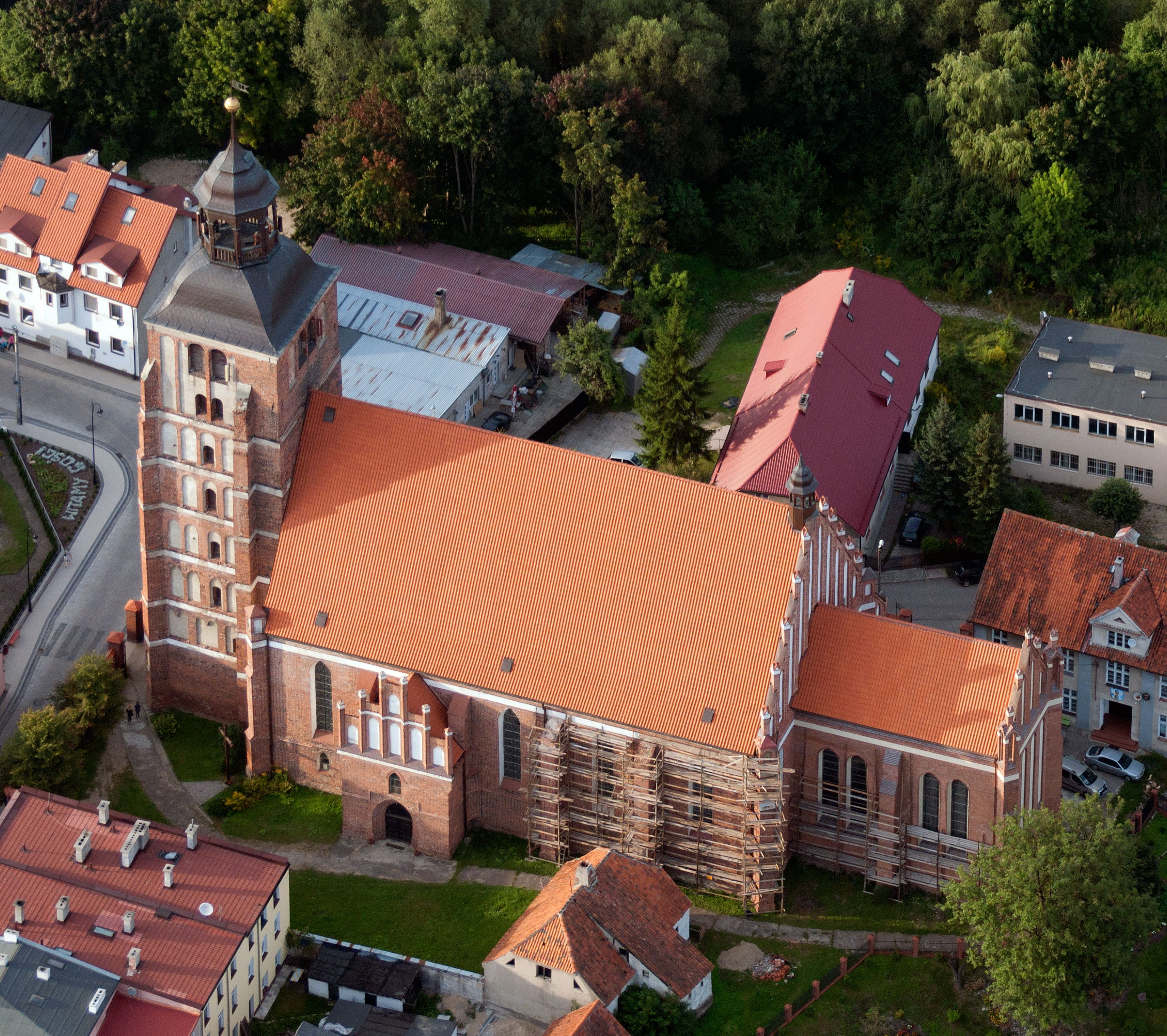
Brick Gothic St. Anne church in the Old Town

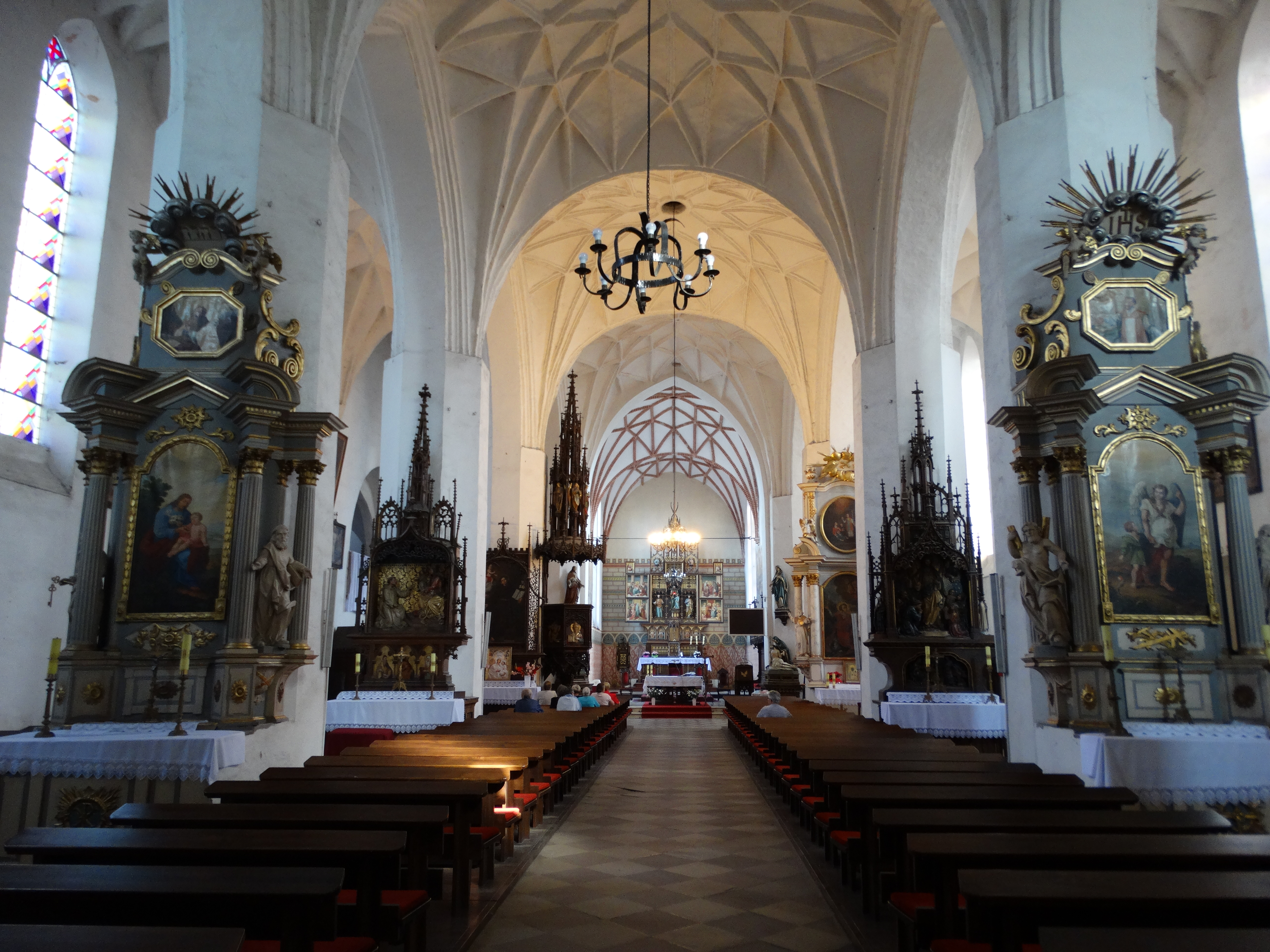
Church of St. Anna (Inner view)

The settlement was first located in 1325 but was soon after destroyed by Lithuanians. The rebuild settlement was granted town rights in 1364. It was known at the time as Wartberg.

In 1440 the town joined the Prussian Confederation, at the request of which Polish King Casimir IV Jagiellon signed the act of incorporation of the region to the Kingdom of Poland in 1454. In 1466, after the Second Peace of Toruń, the town was confirmed as part of Kingdom of Poland. It was the place of fights of the Polish–Teutonic War of 1519–1521. In April 1520 a battle was fought in the vicinity, in November 1520 the town was successfully defended by the Poles, and in January 1521 the Teutonic Knights came back and launched artillery fire on the town, but eventually withdrew. During the Deluge, Brandenburg forced occupied the town in 1656. During the Great Northern War, Polish and Swedish troops marched through the town. In 1772, after the First Partition of Poland it was annexed by the Kingdom of Prussia. In 1807, the town was occupied by France.

According to German statistics Poles constituted 72% of population in 1825 and 62% in 1861; Gerard Labuda and August von Haxthausen give the number of 1500 Poles and 590 Germans living in the town in 1825. The local monastery was secularised in 1810, in 1819/1820 Prussian authorities decided to close down the monastery that has been described as "the stronghold of Polishness." After the death of Father Tyburcjusz Bojarzynowski, last leader of the monastery, in 1834 it has been converted into a state prison. According to Wojciech Zenderowski this was part of Prussian repressions against Poles as the monastery was seen as particularly problematic by Prussian authorities for being a center of Polish resistance.

A Jewish Synagogue was built in 1847, and a Jewish cemetery from the 19th century exists as well. During the January Uprising in 1860s in the Russian Partition of Poland, the town was the local centre of supplying medicine, food and even firearms to Polish rebels, with the Polish society in the town becoming active in war effort and led by August Sokołowski. In 1885 a mass rally was organised by Poles, demanding among others that Polish children should be allowed to use their language in education In 1886 a bookstore with Polish books and publications was opened in the town and came into conflict with German authorities who wanted it to remove Polish language signs.

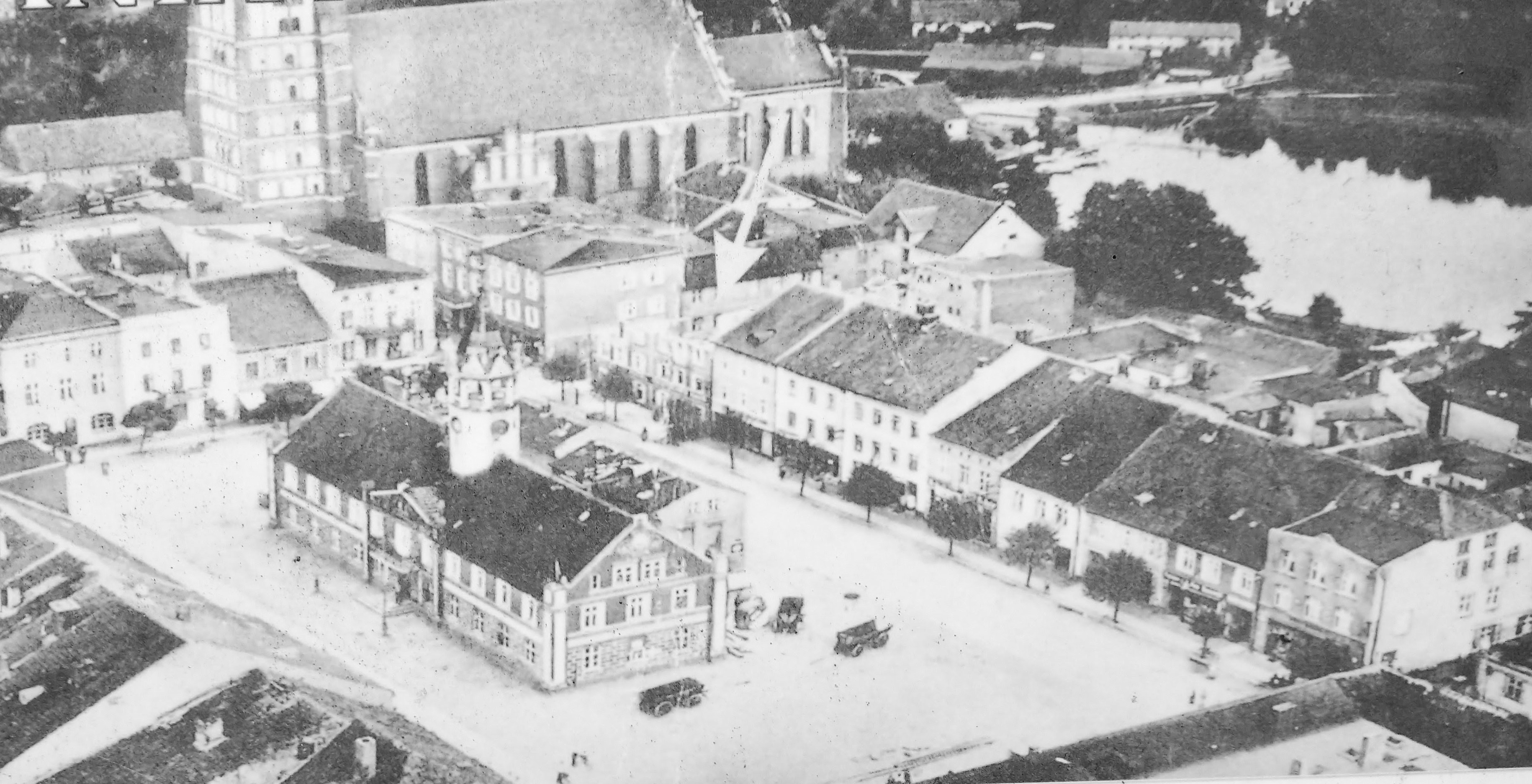
Town center in the 1930s

In the plebiscite of 1920 3,020 inhabitants voted to remain in Weimar German East Prussia, 140 votes supported reborn Poland. In the interwar era the town was the residence of the fictional Kuba spod Wartemborka, a pseudonym of a figure in Polish press in Warmia created by Seweryn Pieniężny (1890-1940) which ridiculed Germanisation efforts against Poles in the region. Polish organisations continued to thrive in the town, up until Second World War; as Nazi Party was elected to power in Germany, repressions intensified, eventually many Polish activists were either imprisoned or, like Pieniężny, murdered in Nazi concentration camps and prisons. During that war, the remaining Jewish community was murdered in the Holocaust. During the war, the German administration operated a Nazi prison in the town, with several forced labour subcamps in the region, including one in the town itself. Many inhabitants fled the town since 21 January 1945, and the last German units withdrew during the night of 30–31 January. The town was occupied by Soviet troops without a fight on 31 January 1945. The Russians then plundered the town and carried out mass deportations of remaining people into the USSR, especially to Siberia. On 22 May 1945 the town, now destroyed at 60%, was handed over to Polish officials.

As part of territorial changes demanded by the Soviet Union, Polish rule was accepted at the Potsdam Conference, however, on preliminary terms. After 173 years, the town was reintegrated with Poland. On 9 March 1946 the prison in Barczewo has also been transferred to Polish authorities. Between 1965 and his death in 1986 it held the former Gauleiter and President of East Prussia Erich Koch. After introduction on Martial law in Poland Barczewo prison also seen opposition activists detained including Władysław Frasyniuk, Adam Michnik, Stefan Niesiołowski, Leszek Moczulski, Romuald Szeremietiew and Józef Szaniawski.

== Historical population ==
- 1825: 2,090 including by mother tongue 1,500 Poles (72%) and 590 Germans (28%).
- 1837: 2,550 including by mother tongue 1,794 Poles (70%) and 756 Germans (30%).
- 1861: 3,272 (77 Jews)
- 1880: 4,499 (111 Jews)
- 1933: 4,818 (40 Jews)
- 1939: 5,841 (23 Jews)

== Sites of interest ==
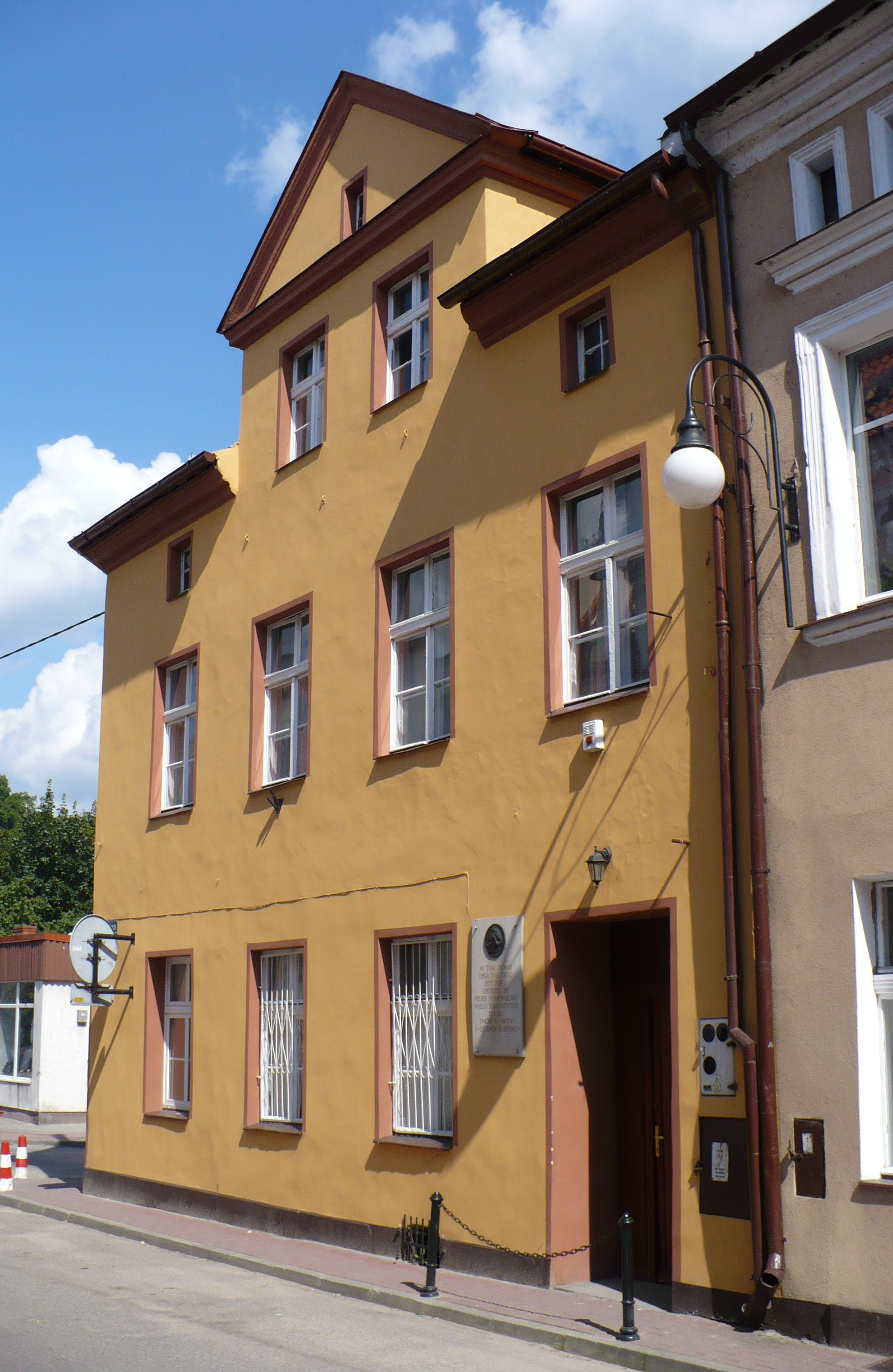
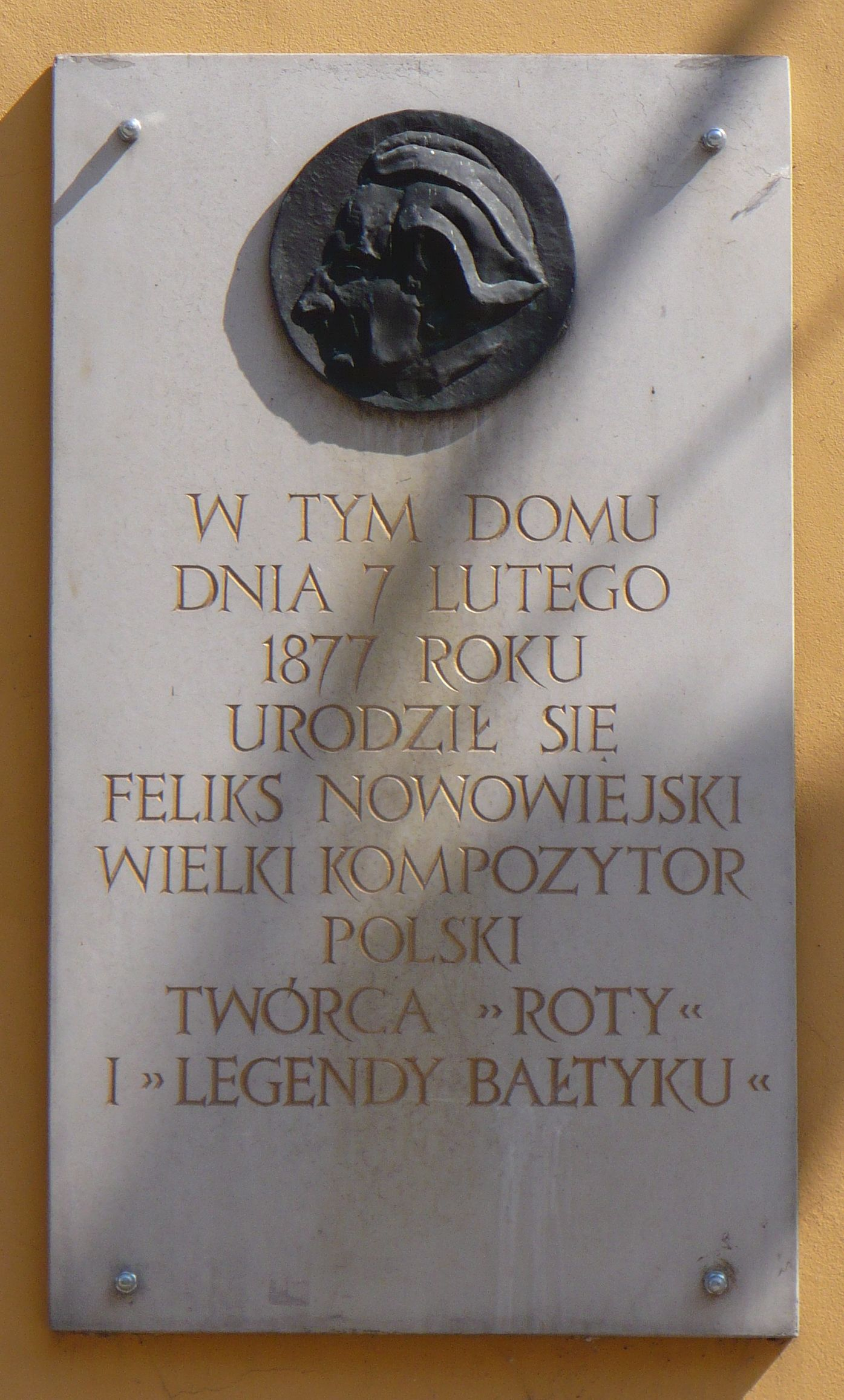
Birthplace of Polish composer Feliks Nowowiejski, now the Feliks Nowowiejski Museum

There is a preserved historic Old Town in Barczewo, with several distinctive monuments, including the Brick Gothic St. Anne church, and the Gothic-Renaissance-Baroque Saint Andrew church, which contains a Mannerist cenotaph of Andrew Báthory and Balthasar Báthory, cousins of Polish King Stephen Báthory. The Feliks Nowowiejski Museum, dedicated to Polish composer and organist Feliks Nowowiejski is located at his birthplace and family home in the Old Town. There are also remains of the old Barczewo Castle.

== Transport ==
The Polish National road 16 and Voivodeship road 595 pass through the town. There is also a train station.

== Sports ==
The local football club is Pisa Barczewo. It competes in the lower leagues.

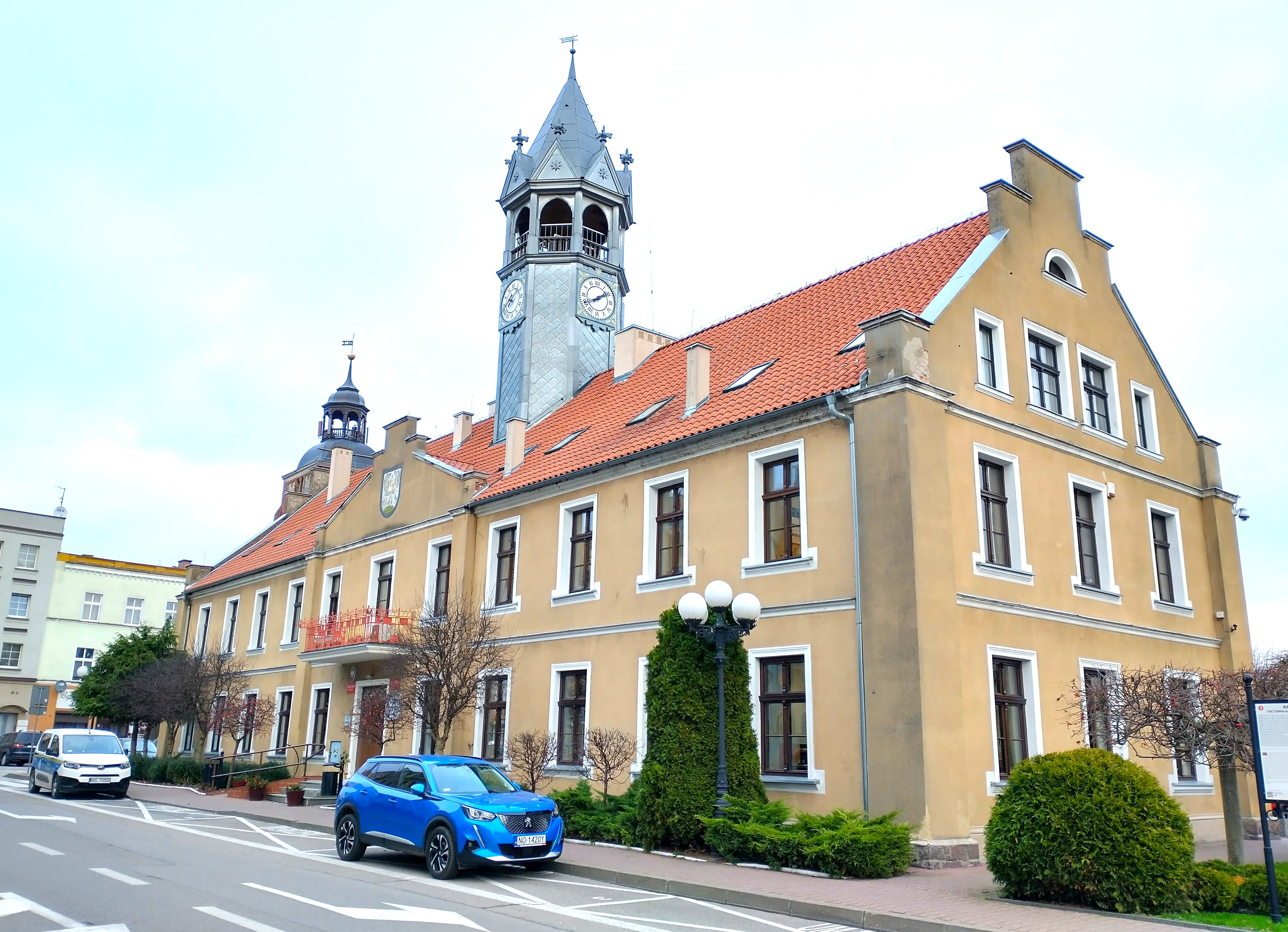
Barczewo Town Hall

== Twin towns and sister cities ==
Barczewo is twinned with:

- Hagen am Teutoburger Wald, Germany

== Notable people ==
- Feliks Nowowiejski (1877–1946), Polish composer
- Robert Pruszkowski (1907–1983), German Roman Catholic priest
- Tomasz Zahorski (born 1984), Polish footballer
