= National road 54 (Poland) =

National road in Poland

National Road 54
- Droga krajowa nr 54

Route information
- Maintained by GDDKiA
- Length: 18 km (11 mi)

Major junctions
- From: Braniewo
- To: Młoteczno

Location
- Country: Poland
- Regions: Warmian-Masurian Voivodeship
- Major cities: Braniewo

Highway system
- National roads in Poland; Voivodeship roads
← DK 53	→ DK 55

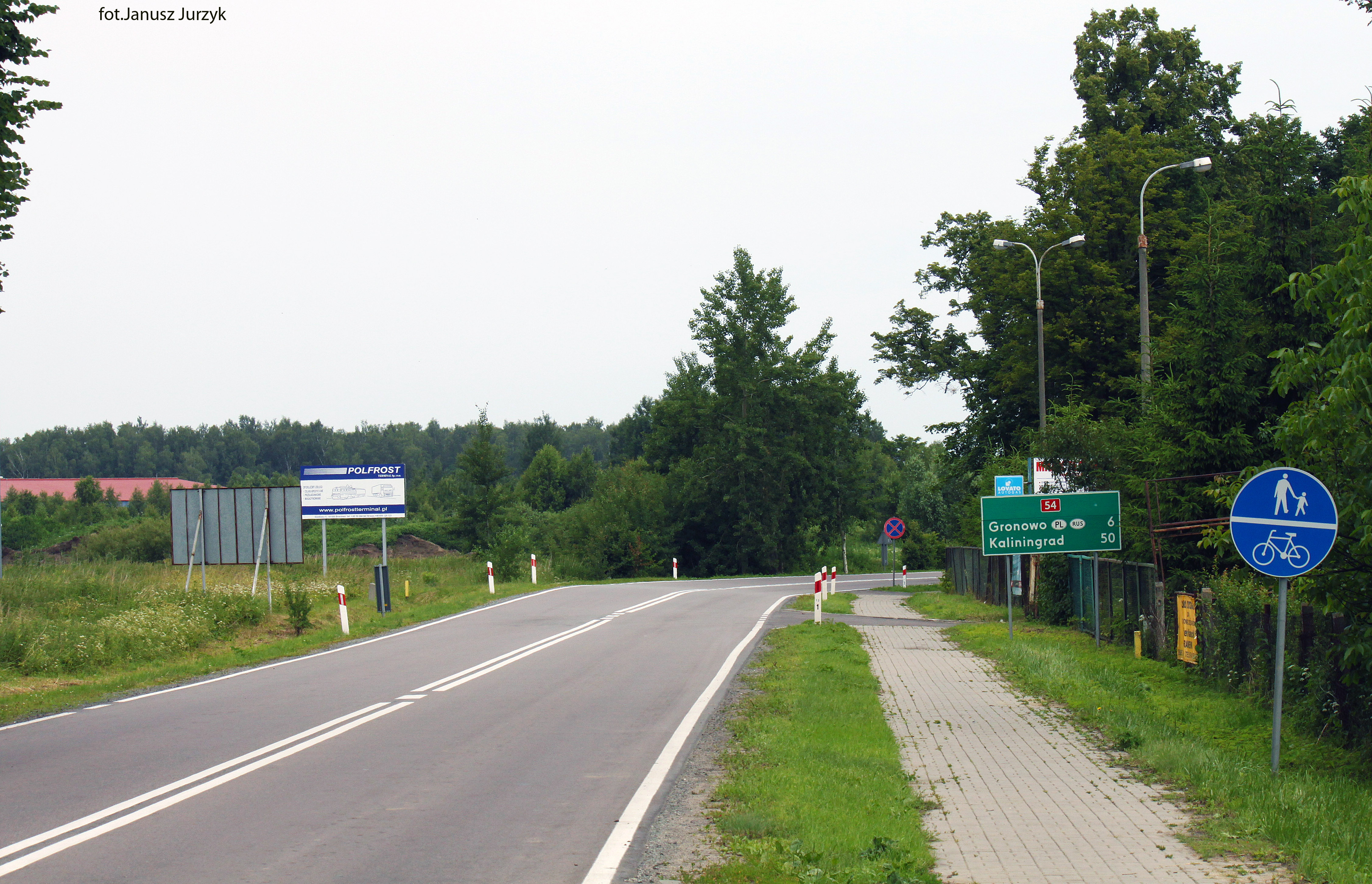
National road 54 in Braniewo

National road 54 (Polish: Droga krajowa nr 54) is a route belonging to the Polish national road network. The highway is a GP-class road, 18 km (11 mi) long, located in the Warmian-Masurian Voivodeship. This route connects the Expressway S22 at the Braniewo-Południe junction near Chruściel with the Gronowo-Mamonovo border crossing near Russia.

== Major towns and villages along the route ==
- Glinka
- Prątnik
- Braniewo
- Młoteczno
- Gronowo

== Axle load limit ==
National road 54 has an axle limit restrictions.

The allowed axle limit is up to 11.5 tons, which is a standard limit on Polish national roads.
