= Pasłęka =

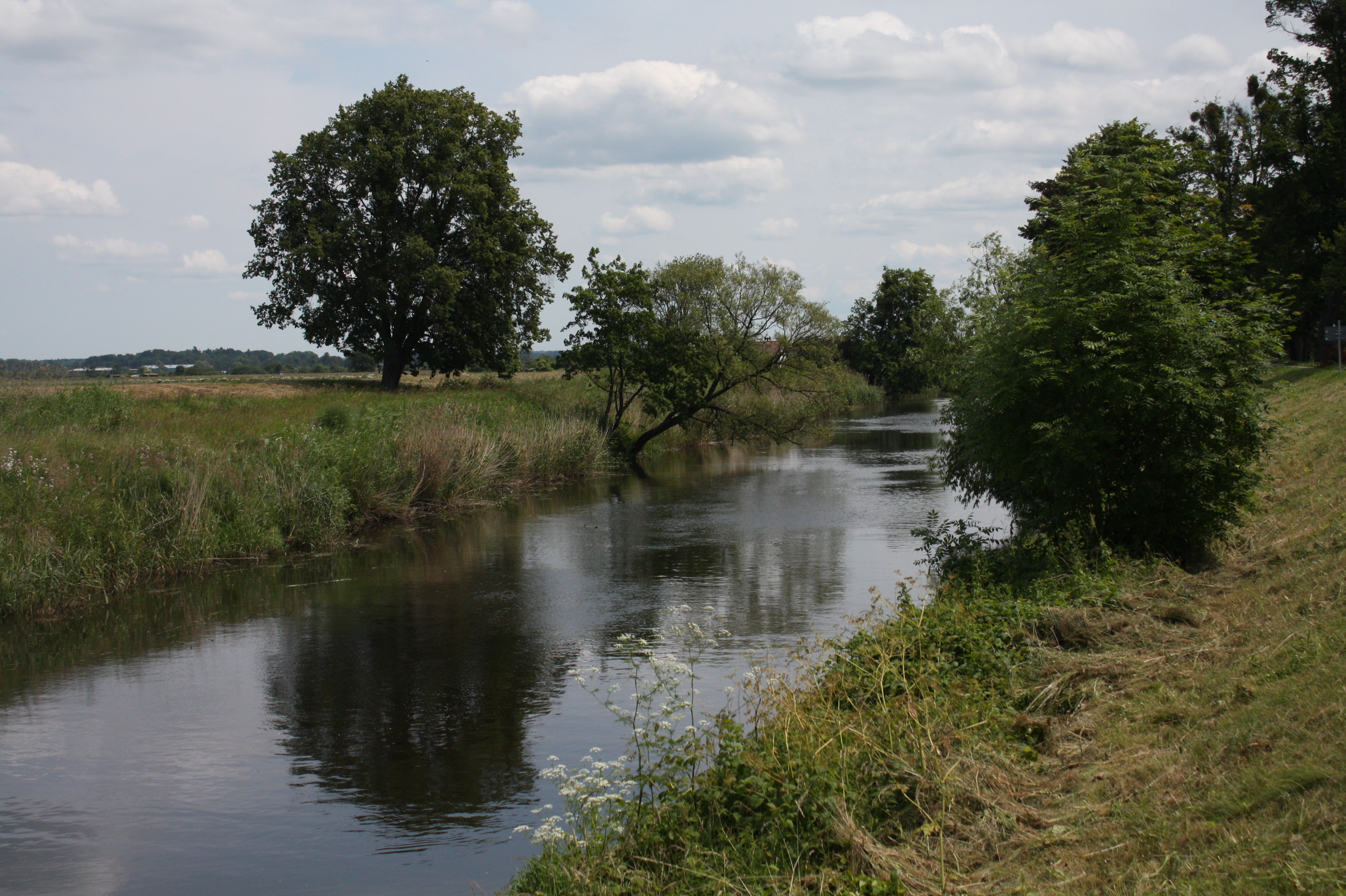
- Pasłęka near Braniewo

- Location of the mouth in Poland

Location
- Country: Poland
- Voivodeship: Warmian-Masurian

Physical characteristics
- Source: Olsztyn Lakeland
  - location: near Olsztynek, Poland
  - coordinates: 53°36′22″N 20°20′14″E
  - elevation: 156.6 m (514 ft)
- Mouth: Vistula Lagoon (Baltic Sea)
  - location: by the Ujście settlement near Nowa Pasłęka, Poland
  - coordinates: 54°25′52″N 19°44′47″E
- Length: 210 km (130 mi)
- Basin size: 2,295 km^{2} (886 sq mi)
- Discharge
  - location: mouth
  - average: 15.7 m^{3}/s (550 cu ft/s)

The Pasłęka (German: Passarge; Lithuanian: Pasargė) is a river in northern Poland that debouches into the Baltic Sea on the Vistula Lagoon near Braniewo. It flows through the Olsztyn and Mrągowo lakelands, and through Gdańsk Coastal Area.

The reported length of the river varies, depending on sources, from 169 to 211 kilometres (105 to 131 mi).

The river springs nearby Olsztynek, between Stawiguda and Gryźliny, at 156.6 meters (514 ft) AMSL; though some sources place it in the Pasłęk reservoir, which lies at 153 m (502 ft) AMSL.

The river flows through the town of Braniewo.

The drainage area of Pasłęka spreads over 2,330 square kilometres (900 sq mi).

Pasłęka's average mouth discharge equals 15.7 m^{3}/s (550 cu ft/s).

The whole length of the river is covered by River Pasłęka Beaver Refugium nature reserve.

Pasłęka is one of Warmia's two main rivers, accompanied by Łyna.

Pasłęka divides two historical lands: Warmia and Upper Prussia (Powiśle), consequently for centuries bordering Polish Warmia and the Polish fiefdoms of the Teutonic Order and Ducal Prussia.

In the 2007 water quality survey conducted on Pasłęka 2 kilometers (1.2 mi) from its mouth, its water was classified as the 4th class.

The historic Polish name Pasłęka was officially confirmed following World War II in 1949, replacing the former German name Passarge.

== Infrastructure ==
Pasłęka is navigable between its mouth in Nowa Pasłęka and the hydro plant in Braniewo. Several hydro plants are built on the river:

- Braniewo - power: 0,815 MVA
- Pierzchały - power: 3,3 MVA, built in 1936
- Stygajny - planned at the site of the unfinished German weir
- 'Kormoran' in Łęgucki Młyn
- Kasztanowo. installed power of 0,1 MW, rebuilt after a complete destruction and reopened in 1989.

== Tributaries ==
- Rivers: Stara Pasłęka, Wałsza p., Giłwa, Jemiołówka, Marąg, Miłakówka.
- Streams: Bardynka, Biebrza, Drwęca Warmińska p., Lipówka, Łaźnica p., Młynówka, Młyńska Struga
- Canals: Kanał Rusy, Kanał Skolity, Kanał Energetyczny

Pasłęka crosses the following lakes: Wymój, Sarąg, Łęguty, Isąg.

== See also ==
- Rivers of Poland
