= Garbina =

Garbina may refer to:

- Garbina, Poland, a village in the Warmian-Masurian Voivodeship
- Garbina, Croatia, a village near Poreč
