= Guzowy =

Guzowy may refer to the following places in Poland:

- Guzowy Młyn
- Guzowy Piec
