= Nowe Sadłuki, Braniewo County =

Nowe Sadłuki
- Settlement
- Location within Poland
- Coordinates: 54°16′16″N 19°45′7″E
- Country: Poland
- Voivodeship: Warmian-Masurian
- County: Braniewo
- Gmina: Frombork
- Population: 67

Nowe Sadłuki (Polish pronunciation: [ˈnɔvɛ saˈdwuki]) is a settlement in the administrative district of Gmina Frombork, within Braniewo County, Warmian-Masurian Voivodeship, in northern Poland.

== History ==
Before 1772 the area was part of Kingdom of Poland, from 1772 to 1945 it was a part of Prussia and Germany (East Prussia).
