= Gietrzwałd =

- Village
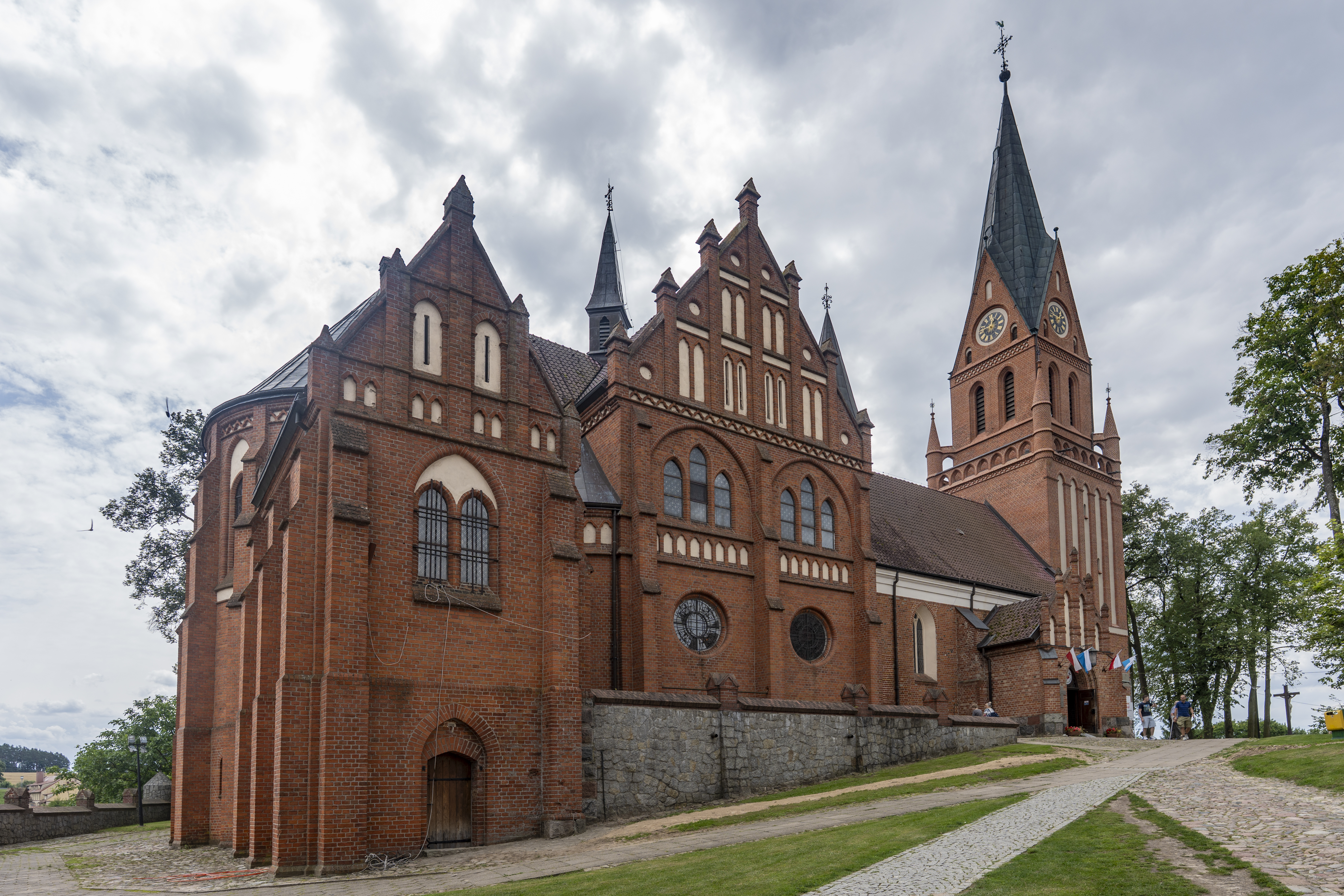
- Basilica of the Nativity of the Virgin Mary in Gietrzwałd
- Interactive map of Gietrzwałd
- Location within Poland
- Coordinates: 53°44′51″N 20°14′8″E
- Country: Poland
- Voivodeship: Warmian-Masurian
- County: Olsztyn
- Gmina: Gietrzwałd
- Founded: 1352

Population (2011)
  - Total: 565
- Time zone: UTC+1 (CET)
  - Summer (DST): UTC+2 (CEST)
- Postal Code: 11-036
- Vehicle registration: NOL
- SIMC: 0473589

Gietrzwałd (Polish pronunciation: [ɟɛtʂˈvawt]) (Note: German: Dietrichswalde) is a village in northern Poland located in Warmia, in the Warmian-Masurian Voivodeship, near Olsztyn. Gietrzwałd is the capital of Gmina Gietrzwałd. Gietrzwałd is a popular Roman Catholic pilgrimage destination due to historical reports of Marian apparitions in the area.

== Natural geography ==
The area where Gietrzwałd is located has specific features caused by a glacier. As a result, the region has varied terrain and great richness and diversity of nature. The most important natural values of the region are its lakes and rivers. The Giławka River, which Gietrzwałd is situated upon, is a right tributary of the Pasłęka River.

== History ==
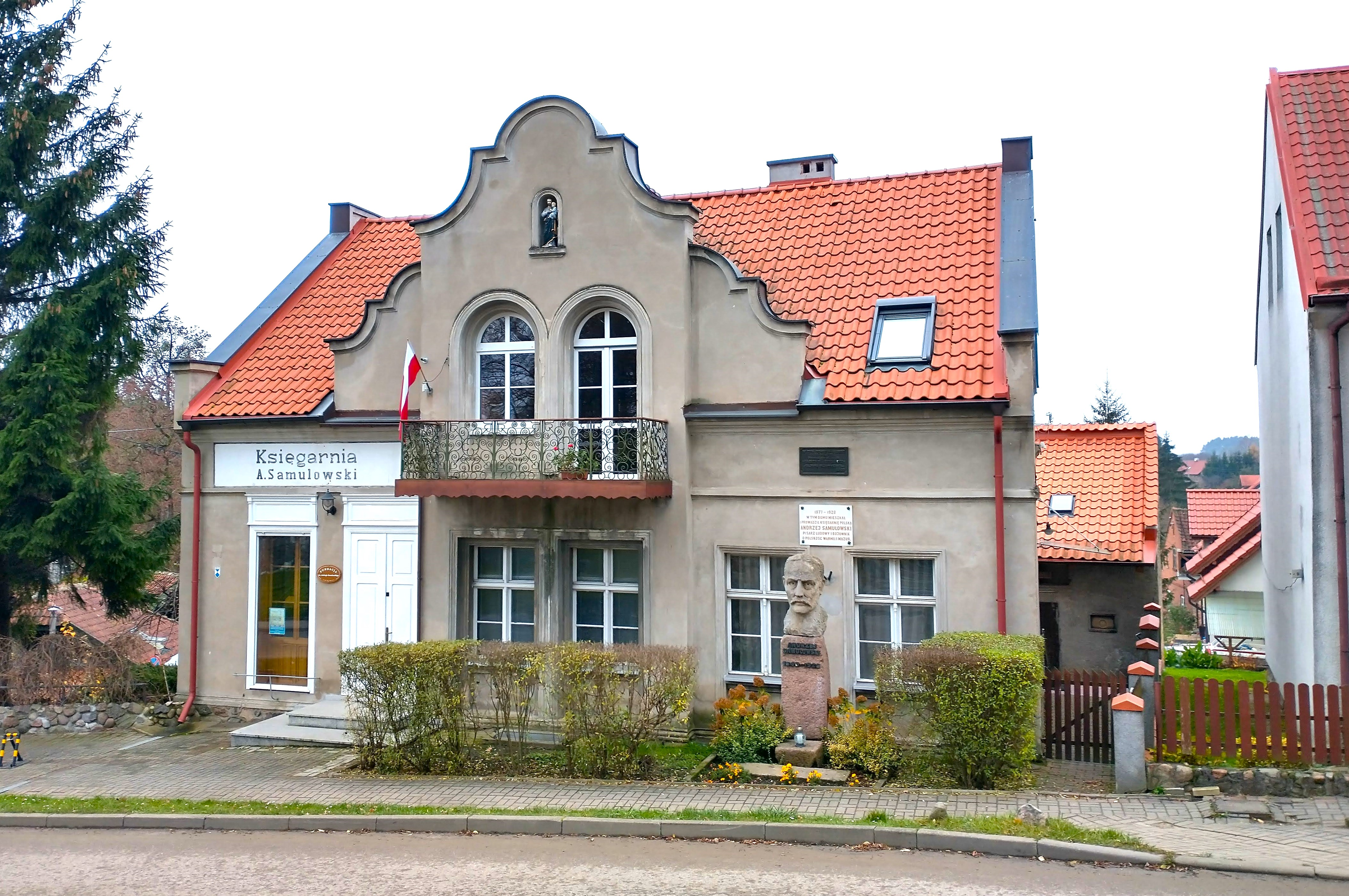
Home of the Polish folk poet and bookseller Andrzej Samulowski (1840–1928)

Gietrzwałd was founded in 1352 within the Archdiocese of Warmia, then within the dominions of the Teutonic Order, by one Dietrich or Ditter, who named it Dietrichswald. In the 15th century, Gietrzwałd was destroyed during the Thirteen Years' War between Poland and the Teutonic Knights. The village was invaded by the Teutonic army under the command of Georg von Schlieben. In the middle of the 16th century, the settlement was not developing, although there was a school and an inn (Jerzy Kunig had been the owner of the inn since 1645). In 1772 the village was annexed by the Kingdom of Prussia in the First Partition of Poland, and subsequently the local Polish population was subjected to Germanisation. In 1783, there were 57 houses in Gietrzwałd. In 1807, the village was attacked and plundered by the French army in the Napoleonic Wars. In 1878, Polish folk poet and activist Andrzej Samulowski established a Polish Catholic bookstore in the village. In the 1880s, the village had a population of some 1,000, exclusively Poles except for one family.

=== Marian apparitions ===
In the year 1877, the Virgin Mary accordingly revealed herself to two girls, Barbara Samulowska and Justyna Szafryńska. She appeared several times, speaking the Polish language as opposed to German, (Note: In East Prussia, German was the main state language. All people in the village, apart from one German family, spoke Polish. The Polish language was persecuted by the Prussian authorities.) and explained the importance of the rosary.

At the same time, in addition to two girls, a dozen women from Warmia and further areas reported claiming to have also had apparitions. Of them were women from Gietrzwałd, such as, 23-year-old Katarzyna Wieczorkówna and 49-year-old widow Elżbieta Bilitewska, whose visions lasted until 1879. Their visions are also usually classified as Gietrzwałd's apparitions, and have received recognition of the parish priest. Since then, pilgrims from Poland and other countries, have been coming to Gietrzwałd to see the picture of the Virgin Mary and a spring with claimed miraculous powers. In 1977, bishop Józef Drzazga declared that the cult of the apparitions was "not contrary to Christian faith and morals" and was "based on credible facts" of a supernatural character. The town is now an official pilgrim area.

== Culture ==
The Communal Cultural Centre in Gietrzwałd is open all year. People can find tourist information there and buy handcrafts in a gallery. The centre is the initiator and organizer of various events, which take place in the province. Furthermore, it is responsible for taking actions in social and cultural animation, education and art workshops for children and adults.

=== Religion ===
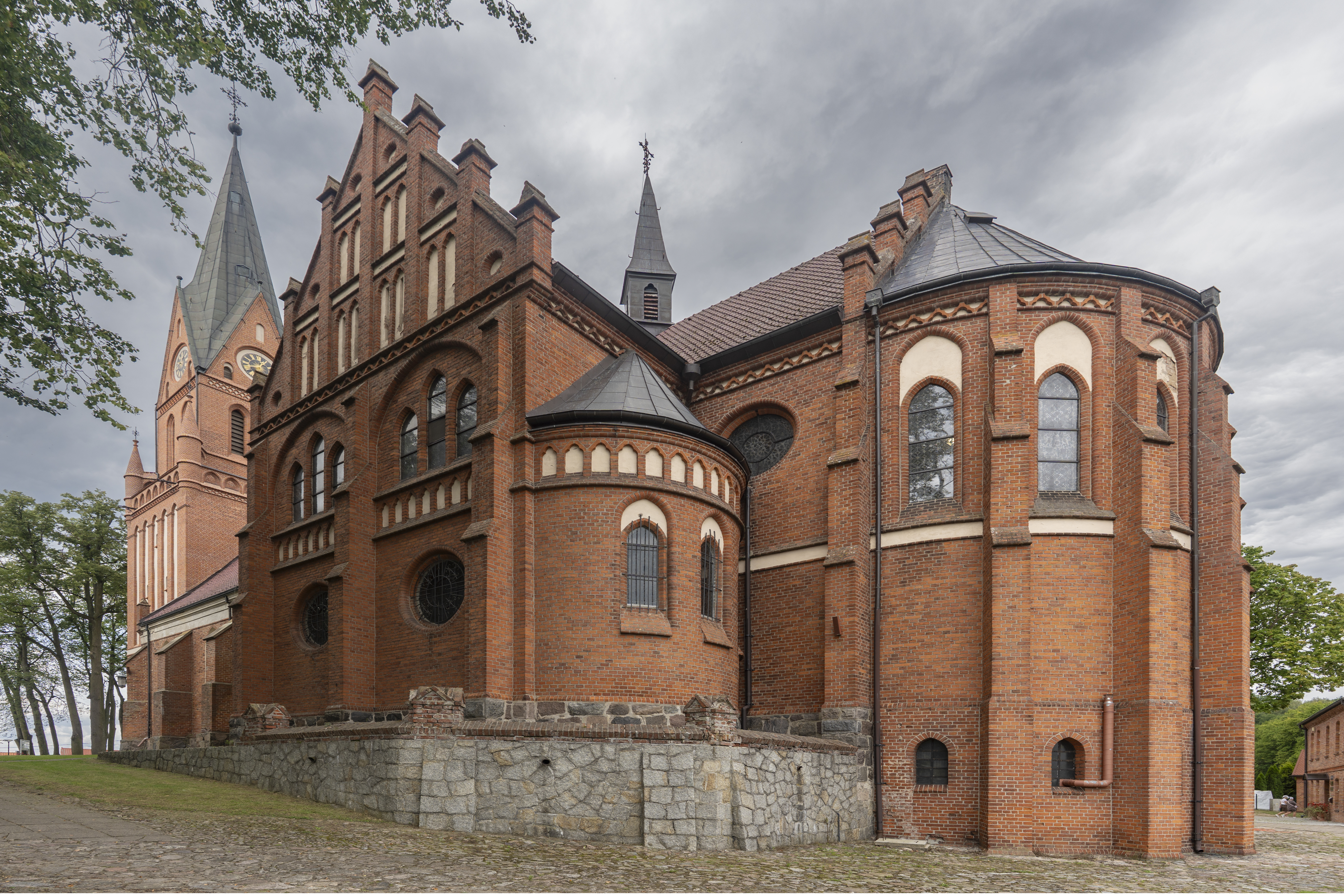
Basilica of the Nativity of the Virgin Mary

The most important religious monument in Gietrzwałd is the Shrine of Virgin Mary and the Stations of the Cross located near the forest. There is also a rosary alley leading to the associated spring, the Chapel of the apparitions and the picture of Virgin Mary. This chapel is the most famous of the local chapels which are a distinctive element of the Warmian landscape.

== Education ==
Schools in Gietrzwałd:

- Andrzej Samulowski Primary School
- Father W. Zink Middle School.

== Transport ==
Buses run from Olsztyn and Ostróda to the village. It is also connected to Olsztyn by National Road 16. The nearest railway station is located 5 km (3 mi) from the village, in Biesal.
