= Marcinkowski =

Marcinkowski (feminine Marcinkowska) is a Polish toponymic surname, denoting a person from the village of Marcinkowo or Marcinkowice. Notable people include:

- Andrzej Marcinkowski (1929–2010), Polish politician
- Dariusz Marcinkowski (born 1975), Polish field hockey player
- JT Marcinkowski (born 1997), American professional soccer goalkeeper
- James Marcinkowski (born 1955), American CIA officer
- Karol Marcinkowski (1800–1846), Polish physician
- Renata Marcinkowska (born 1965), Polish tennis player
- Władysław Marcinkowski (1858–1947), Polish sculptor
