= Biedkowo =

- Village
- Location within Poland
- Coordinates: 54°19′26″N 19°44′48″E
- Country: Poland
- Voivodeship: Warmian-Masurian
- County: Braniewo
- Gmina: Frombork
- Elevation: 19 m (62 ft)
- Population: 194
- Website: www.biedkowo.pl

Biedkowo (Polish pronunciation: [bjɛtˈkɔvɔ]) is a village in the administrative district of Gmina Frombork, within Braniewo County, Warmian-Masurian Voivodeship, in northern Poland.
