= Żelazna Góra =

- Village
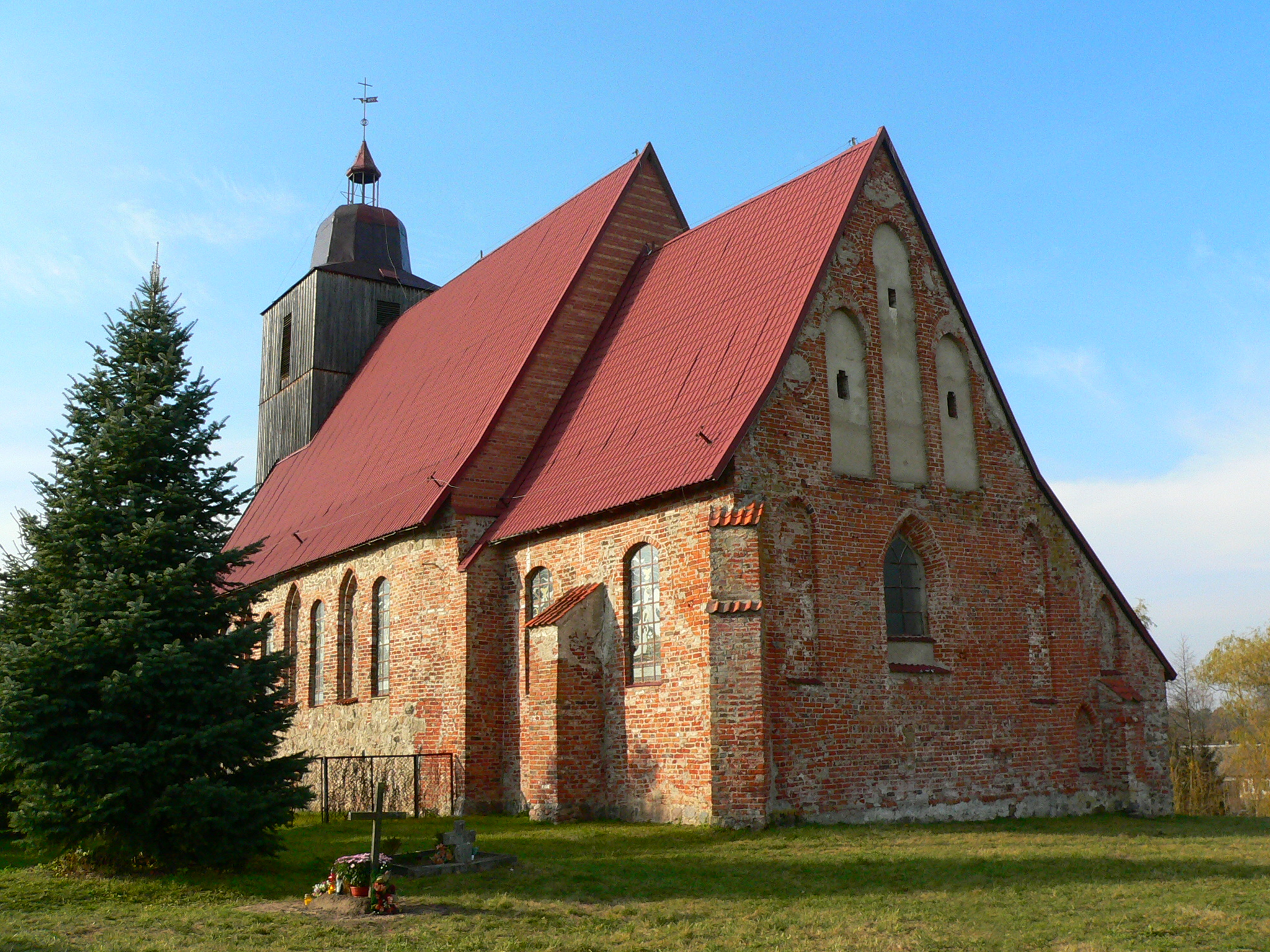
- Village church

- Location within Poland
- Coordinates: 54°23′26″N 20°2′10″E
- Country: Poland
- Voivodeship: Warmian-Masurian
- County: Braniewo
- Gmina: Braniewo
- Population: 394

Żelazna Góra [ʐɛˈlazna ˈɡura] is a village in the administrative district of Gmina Braniewo, within Braniewo County, Warmian-Masurian Voivodeship, in northern Poland, close to the border with the Kaliningrad Oblast of Russia.
