= Drewnowo, Warmian-Masurian Voivodeship =

Drewnowo
- Village
- Location within Poland
- Coordinates: 54°18′13″N 19°45′2″E
- Country: Poland
- Voivodeship: Warmian-Masurian
- County: Braniewo
- Gmina: Frombork

Drewnowo (Polish pronunciation: [drɛvˈnɔvɔ]) is a village in the administrative district of Gmina Frombork, within Braniewo County, Warmian-Masurian Voivodeship, in northern Poland.

Before 1772 the area was part of Kingdom of Poland, and in 1772–1945 it belonged to Prussia and Germany (East Prussia).
