= Bliżewo =

- Settlement
- Location within Poland
- Coordinates: 54°17′23″N 19°52′6″E
- Country: Poland
- Voivodeship: Warmian-Masurian
- County: Braniewo
- Gmina: Płoskinia

Bliżewo [bliˈʐɛvɔ] is a settlement in the administrative district of Gmina Płoskinia, within Braniewo County, Warmian-Masurian Voivodeship, in northern Poland.
