= Wierzno Wielkie =

- Village
- Location within Poland
- Coordinates: 54°16′27″N 19°44′39″E
- Country: Poland
- Voivodeship: Warmian-Masurian
- County: Braniewo
- Gmina: Frombork
- Population: 180

Wierzno Wielkie (Polish pronunciation: [ˈvjɛʐnɔ ˈvjɛlkʲɛ]) is a village in the administrative district of Gmina Frombork, within Braniewo County, Warmian-Masurian Voivodeship, in northern Poland.

Before 1772 the area was part of Kingdom of Poland, and in 1772–1945 it belonged to Prussia and Germany (East Prussia).
