= Adam Tomasiak =

Polish rower (born 1953)

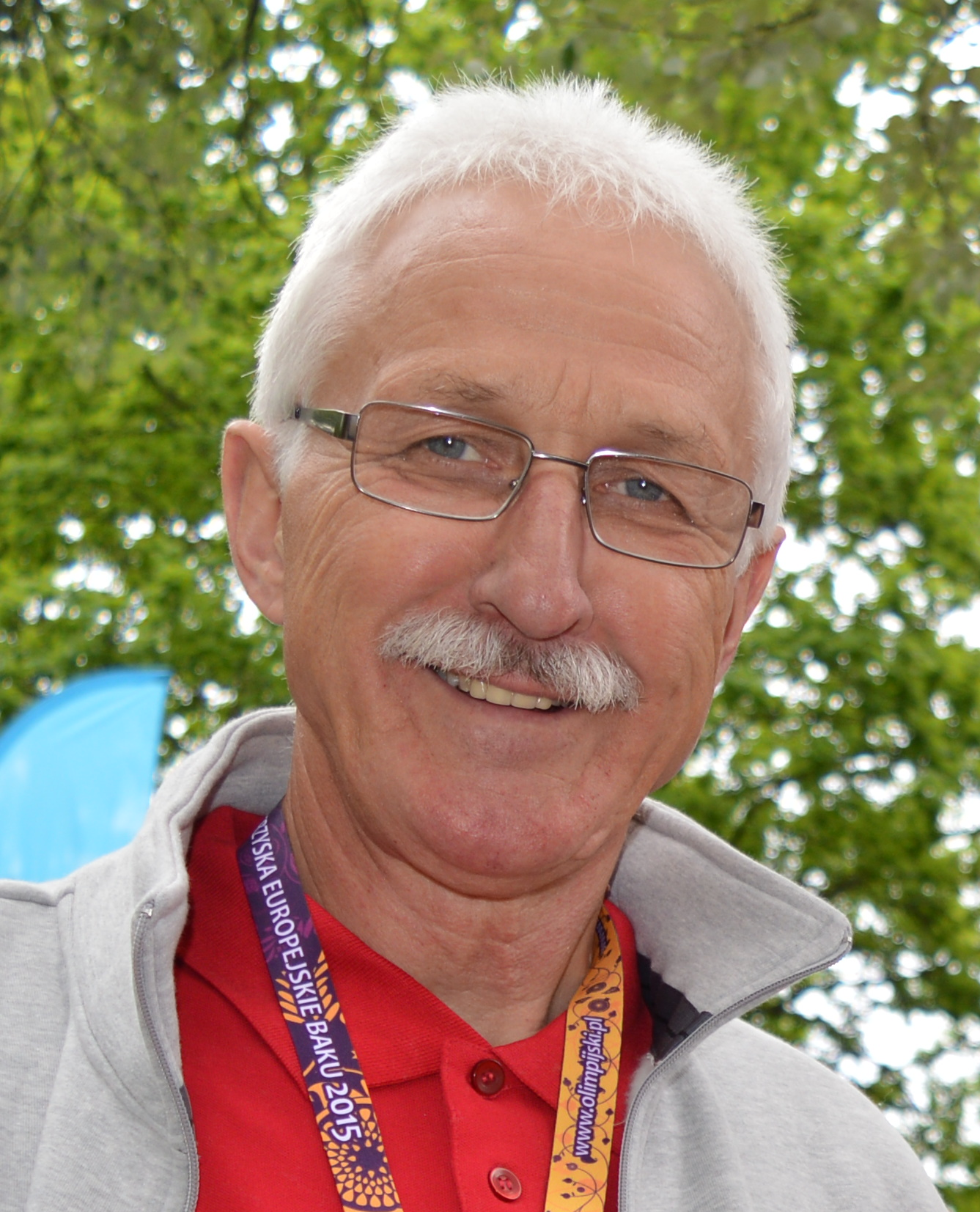

Personal information
- Born: 15 February 1953 (age 73) Biesal, Gmina Gietrzwałd, Poland
- Height: 200 cm (6 ft 7 in)
- Weight: 95 kg (209 lb)
Medal record
Men's rowing
Representing Poland
Olympic Games
Bronze medal – third place	1980 Moscow	Coxed four

Adam Tomasiak (born 15 February 1953) is a Polish rower who competed in the 1976 Summer Olympics and in the 1980 Summer Olympics.

He was born in Biesal, Gmina Gietrzwałd.

In 1976 he was a crew member of the Polish boat which finished eighth in the coxed four event.

Four years later he won the bronze medal with the Polish boat in the 1980 coxed fours competition. In the same Olympics he also competed with the Polish team in the 1980 eights contest and finished ninth.
