= Czosnowo =

Czosnowo may refer to the following villages:

- Czosnowo, Pomeranian Voivodeship (north Poland)
- Czosnowo, Warmian-Masurian Voivodeship (north-east Poland)
