= Józefowo, Braniewo County =

Józefowo
- Village
- Location within Poland
- Coordinates: 54°20′44″N 19°48′1″E
- Country: Poland
- Voivodeship: Warmian-Masurian
- County: Braniewo
- Gmina: Braniewo
- Population: 57

Józefowo (Polish: [juzɛˈfɔvɔ]; German: Josephsau) is a village in the administrative district of Gmina Braniewo, within Braniewo County, Warmian-Masurian Voivodeship, in northern Poland, close to the border with the Kaliningrad Oblast of Russia.
