= Łojewo, Warmian-Masurian Voivodeship =

Łojewo
- Village
- Location within Poland
- Coordinates: 54°15′10″N 19°57′27″E
- Country: Poland
- Voivodeship: Warmian-Masurian
- County: Braniewo
- Gmina: Płoskinia

Łojewo [wɔˈjɛvɔ] is a village in the administrative district of Gmina Płoskinia, within Braniewo County, Warmian-Masurian Voivodeship, in northern Poland.
