= Krzewno =

Krzewno may refer to the following places in Poland:

- Krzewno, Warmian-Masurian Voivodeship
- Krzewno, West Pomeranian Voivodeship
