= Wikielec, Braniewo County =

Wikielec
- Settlement
- Location within Poland
- Coordinates: 54°22′20″N 19°47′35″E
- Country: Poland
- Voivodeship: Warmian-Masurian
- County: Braniewo
- Gmina: Braniewo

Wikielec [viˈkʲɛlɛt͡s] is a settlement in the administrative district of Gmina Iława, within Braniewo County, Warmian-Masurian Voivodeship, in northern Poland, close to the border with the Kaliningrad Oblast of Russia.
