= Rosenort =

Rosenort, may refer to:

- Rosenort, Manitoba, a community located about 17 kilometres from Morris, Manitoba
  - Rosenort Airport, located adjacent to Rosenort
- Rosenort, Saskatchewan, a hamlet in Coulee Rural Municipality No. 136

== See also ==
- Różaniec (disambiguation)
