= Podlechy, Braniewo County =

Podlechy
- Village
- Location within Poland
- Coordinates: 54°15′N 20°0′E
- Country: Poland
- Voivodeship: Warmian-Masurian
- County: Braniewo
- Gmina: Płoskinia

Podlechy [pɔdˈlɛxɨ] is a village in the administrative district of Gmina Płoskinia, within Braniewo County, Warmian-Masurian Voivodeship, in northern Poland.
