= Baranówka, Warmian-Masurian Voivodeship =

Baranówka
- Village
- Location within Poland
- Coordinates: 54°18′57″N 19°42′57″E
- Country: Poland
- Voivodeship: Warmian-Masurian
- County: Braniewo
- Gmina: Frombork
- Population: 170

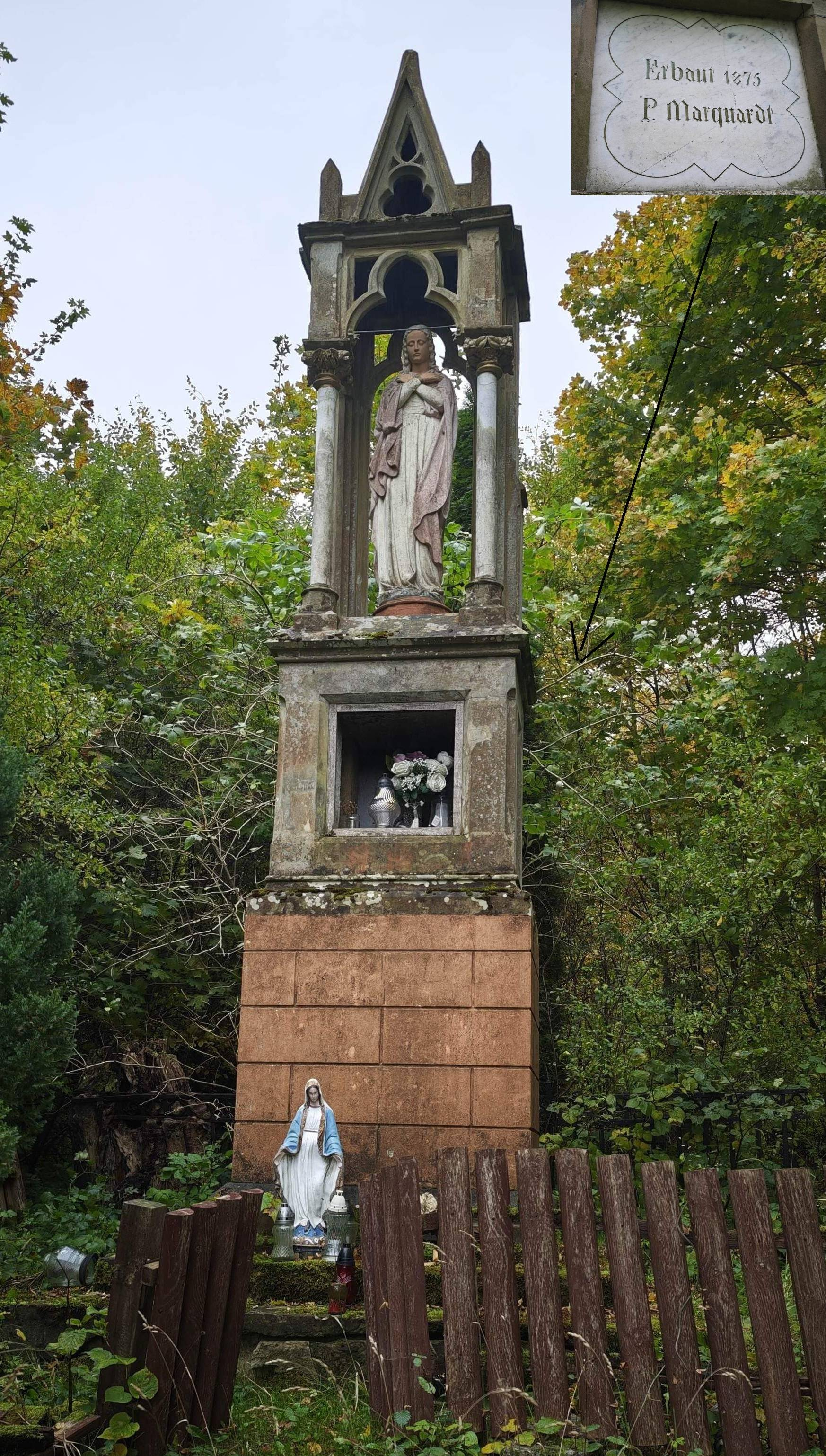

Baranówka (Polish pronunciation: [baraˈnufka]) is a village in the administrative district of Gmina Frombork, within Braniewo County, Warmian-Masurian Voivodeship, in northern Poland.
