= Trąbki =

Trąbki may refer to:

- Trąbki, Lesser Poland Voivodeship (south Poland)
- Trąbki, Masovian Voivodeship (east-central Poland)
- Trąbki, Warmian-Masurian Voivodeship (north Poland)
- Trąbki, West Pomeranian Voivodeship (north-west Poland)

== See also ==
- Trąby
