= Bogdany, Braniewo County =

Bogdany
- Village
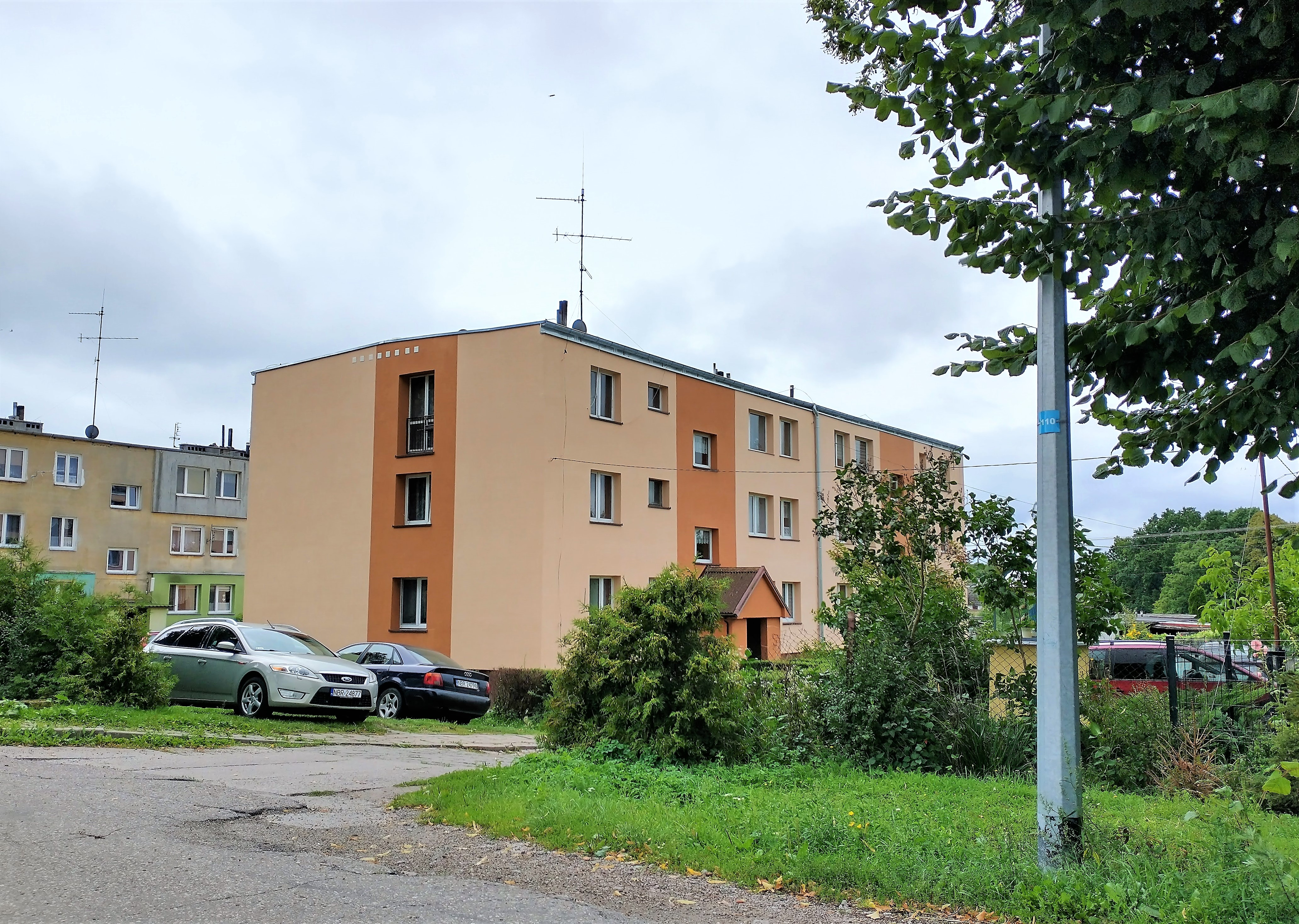

- Location within Poland
- Coordinates: 54°20′N 19°44′E
- Country: Poland
- Voivodeship: Warmian-Masurian
- County: Braniewo
- Gmina: Frombork

Population
  - Total: 270
- Time zone: UTC+1 (CET)
  - Summer (DST): UTC+2 (CEST)
- Vehicle registration: NBR

Bogdany (Polish pronunciation: [bɔɡˈdanɨ]) is a village in the administrative district of Gmina Frombork, within Braniewo County, Warmian-Masurian Voivodeship, in northern Poland.
