= Dąbrowa, Braniewo County =

Dąbrowa
- Village
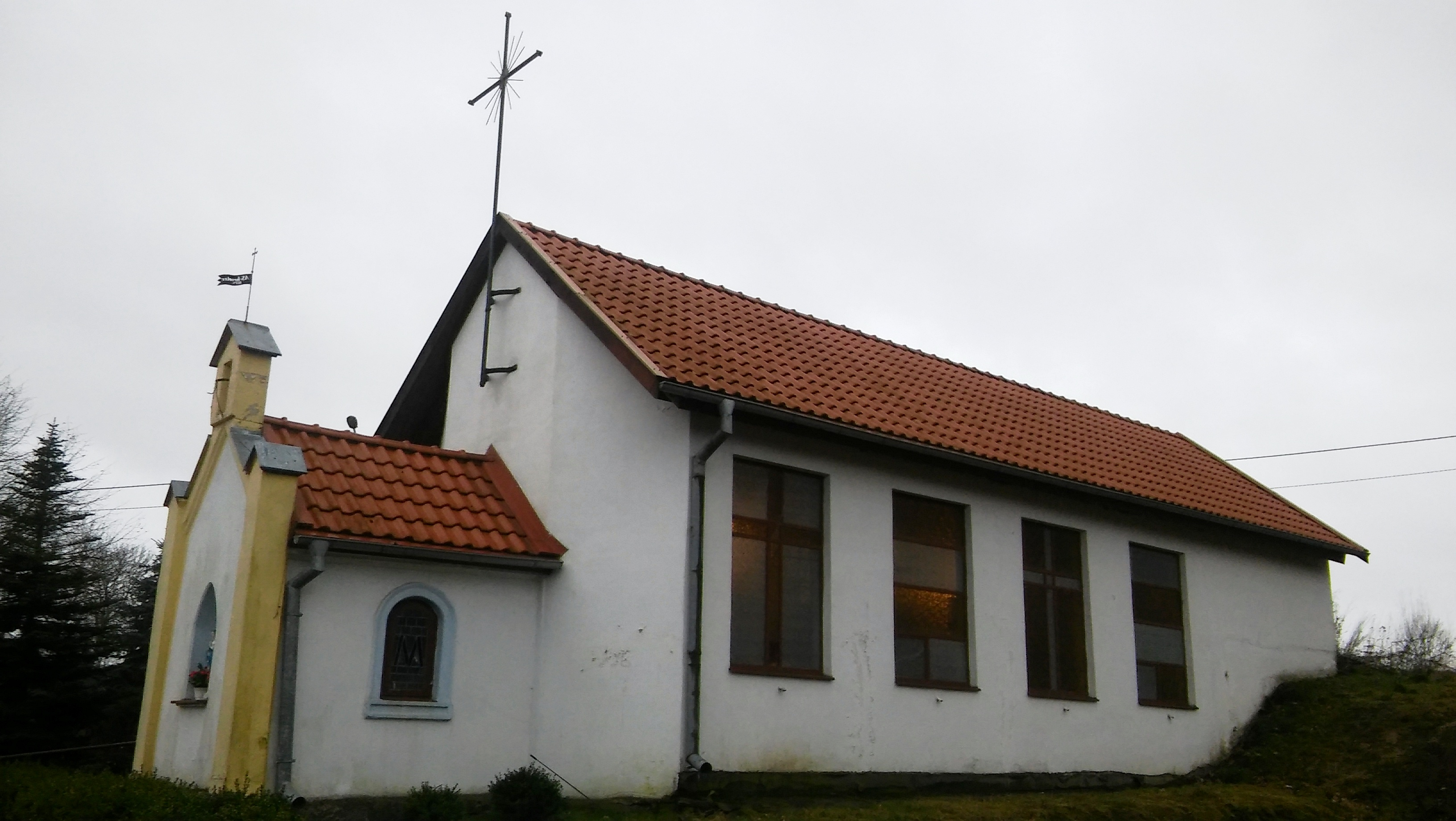
- Catholic chapel in Dąbrowa

- Location within Poland
- Coordinates: 54°17′N 19°53′E
- Country: Poland
- Voivodeship: Warmian-Masurian
- County: Braniewo
- Gmina: Płoskinia
- Vehicle registration: NBR

Dąbrowa [dɔmˈbrɔva] is a village in the administrative district of Gmina Płoskinia, within Braniewo County, Warmian-Masurian Voivodeship, in northern Poland.

Dąbrowa formed part of Poland until the First Partition of Poland in 1772, when it was annexed by Kingdom of Prussia, and from 1871 to 1945 it was also part of Germany, where it was administratively located in the province of East Prussia. After Germany's defeat in World War II, the village became again part of Poland.
