= Wilki, Warmian-Masurian Voivodeship =

Village in Poland

Wilki
- Settlement
- Location within Poland
- Coordinates: 54°25′3″N 19°57′39″E
- Country: Poland
- Voivodeship: Warmian-Masurian
- County: Braniewo
- Gmina: Braniewo

Population
  - Total: 2
- Postal code: 14-500

Wilki [ˈvilki] is a settlement in the administrative district of Gmina Braniewo, within Braniewo County, Warmian-Masurian Voivodeship, in northern Poland, close to the border with the Kaliningrad Oblast of Russia.
