= Płoskinia-Kolonia =

- Village
- Location within Poland
- Coordinates: 54°15′25″N 19°56′46″E
- Country: Poland
- Voivodeship: Warmian-Masurian
- County: Braniewo
- Gmina: Płoskinia

Płoskinia-Kolonia [pwɔsˈkiɲa kɔˈlɔɲa] is a village in the administrative district of Gmina Płoskinia, within Braniewo County, Warmian-Masurian Voivodeship, in northern Poland.
