= Jędrychowo =

Jędrychowo may refer to:

- Jędrychowo, Braniewo County in Warmian-Masurian Voivodeship (north Poland)
- Jędrychowo, Iława County in Warmian-Masurian Voivodeship (north Poland)
- Jędrychowo, Mrągowo County in Warmian-Masurian Voivodeship (north Poland)
- Jędrychowo, Ostróda County in Warmian-Masurian Voivodeship (north Poland)
