= Elżbiecin, Warmian-Masurian Voivodeship =

Elżbiecin
- Settlement
- Location within Poland
- Coordinates: 54°22′31″N 19°47′48″E
- Country: Poland
- Voivodeship: Warmian-Masurian
- County: Braniewo
- Gmina: Braniewo

Elżbiecin [ɛlʐˈbjɛt͡ɕin] is a settlement in the administrative district of Gmina Braniewo, within Braniewo County, Warmian-Masurian Voivodeship, in northern Poland, close to the border with the Kaliningrad Oblast of Russia.
