= Jarocin, Warmian-Masurian Voivodeship =

Jarocin
- Village
- Location within Poland
- Coordinates: 54°24′21″N 20°5′16″E
- Country: Poland
- Voivodeship: Warmian-Masurian
- County: Braniewo
- Gmina: Braniewo
- Population: 180

Jarocin [jaˈrɔt͡ɕin] is a village in the administrative district of Gmina Braniewo, within Braniewo County, Warmian-Masurian Voivodeship, in northern Poland and is close to the border with the Kaliningrad Oblast of Russia.
