= Rusy =

Rusy Rossen
- Village
- Location within Poland
- Coordinates: 54°25′20″N 19°49′42″E
- Country: Poland
- Voivodeship: Warmian-Masurian
- County: Braniewo
- Gmina: Braniewo
- Population: 24

Rusy [ˈrusɨ] is a village in the administrative district of Gmina Braniewo, within Braniewo County, Warmian-Masurian Voivodeship, in northern Poland, close to the border with the Kaliningrad Oblast of Russia.
