= Krzywiec, Braniewo County =

Krzywiec
- Village
- Location within Poland
- Coordinates: 54°18′N 19°40′E
- Country: Poland
- Voivodeship: Warmian-Masurian
- County: Braniewo
- Gmina: Frombork

Krzywiec (Polish pronunciation: [ˈkʂɨvjɛt͡s]) is a village in the administrative district of Gmina Frombork, within Braniewo County, Warmian-Masurian Voivodeship, in northern Poland.
