= Pęciszewo =

- Village
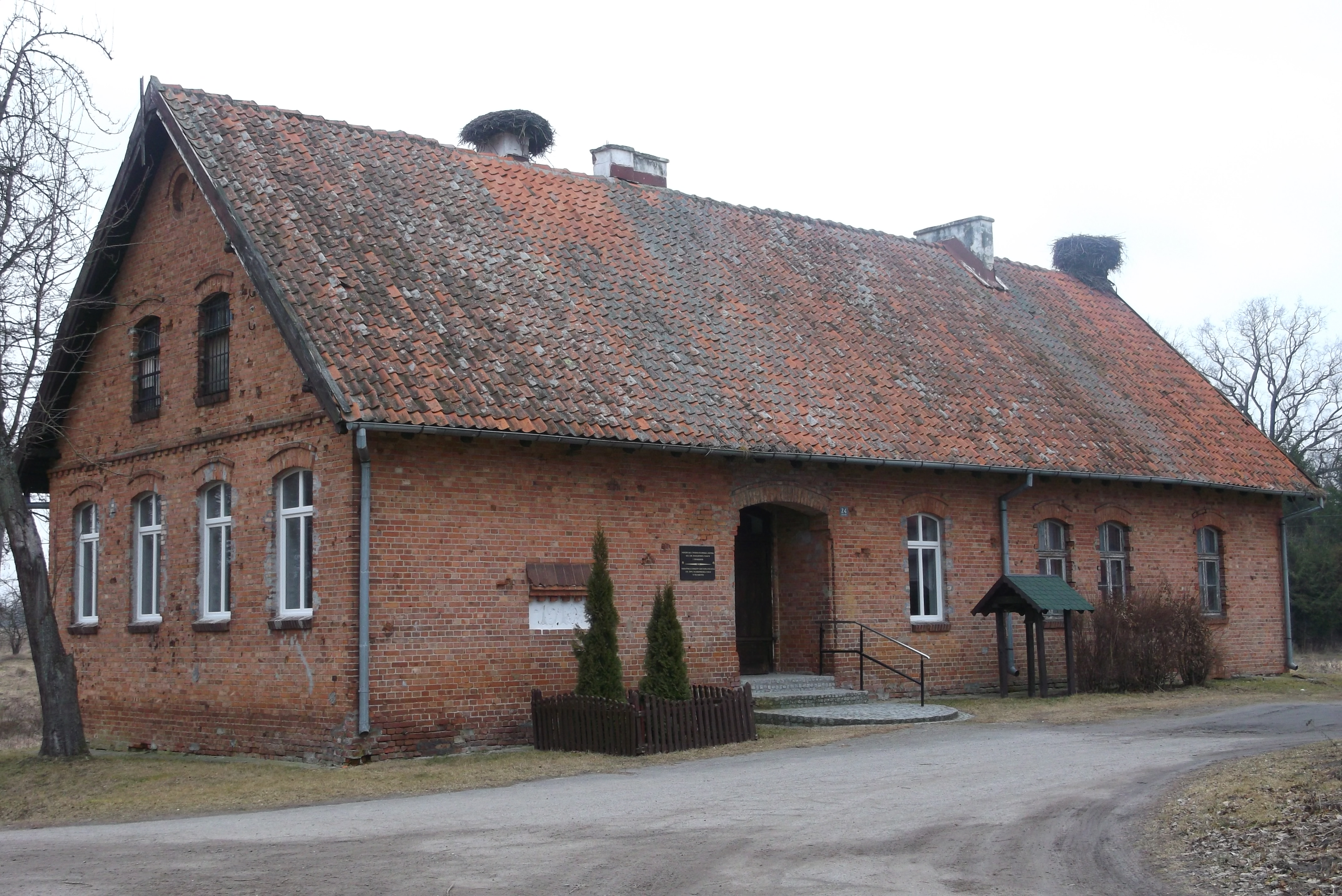

- Location within Poland
- Coordinates: 54°24′53″N 19°59′15″E
- Country: Poland
- Voivodeship: Warmian-Masurian
- County: Braniewo
- Gmina: Braniewo
- Population: 79

Pęciszewo [pɛnt͡ɕiˈʂɛvɔ] is a village in the administrative district of Gmina Braniewo, within Braniewo County, Warmian-Masurian Voivodeship, in northern Poland, close to the border with the Kaliningrad Oblast of Russia.

== Notable residents ==
- Helmut Echternach (1907-1988), Lutheran theologian and pastor
