= Rydzówka =

Rydzówka may refer to the following places:

- Rydzówka, Braniewo County in Warmian-Masurian Voivodeship (north Poland)
- Rydzówka, Elbląg County in Warmian-Masurian Voivodeship (north Poland)
- Rydzówka, Węgorzewo County in Warmian-Masurian Voivodeship (north Poland)
