= Klejnówko =

- Village
- Location within Poland
- Coordinates: 54°24′50″N 19°46′15″E
- Country: Poland
- Voivodeship: Warmian-Masurian
- County: Braniewo
- Gmina: Braniewo
- Population: 45

Klejnówko [klɛi̯ˈnufkɔ] is a village in the administrative district of Gmina Braniewo, within Braniewo County, Warmian-Masurian Voivodeship, in northern Poland, close to the border with the Kaliningrad Oblast of Russia.
