= Piórkowo, Warmian-Masurian Voivodeship =

Piórkowo
- Village
- Location within Poland
- Coordinates: 54°13′51″N 19°48′36″E
- Country: Poland
- Voivodeship: Warmian-Masurian
- County: Braniewo
- Gmina: Płoskinia

Piórkowo [pjurˈkɔvɔ] is a village in the administrative district of Gmina Płoskinia, within Braniewo County, Warmian-Masurian Voivodeship, in northern Poland.
