= Podleśne, Braniewo County =

Podleśne
- Village
- Location within Poland
- Coordinates: 54°24′46″N 19°56′12″E
- Country: Poland
- Voivodeship: Warmian-Masurian
- County: Braniewo
- Gmina: Braniewo
- Population: 283

Podleśne [pɔdˈlɛɕnɛ] is a village in the administrative district of Gmina Braniewo, within Braniewo County, Warmian-Masurian Voivodeship, in northern Poland, close to the border with the Kaliningrad Oblast of Russia.
