= Gmina Płoskinia =

Gmina Płoskinia Płoskinia Commune
- Gmina
- Coat of arms
- Interactive map of Gmina Płoskinia
- Coordinates (Płoskinia): 54°16′10″N 19°56′18″E
- Country: Poland
- Voivodeship: Warmian-Masurian
- County: Braniewo
- Seat: Płoskinia

Area
  - Total: 172.05 km^{2} (66.43 sq mi)

Population (2006)
  - Total: 2,707
  - Density: 15.73/km^{2} (40.75/sq mi)

Gmina Płoskinia is a rural gmina (administrative district) in Braniewo County, Warmian-Masurian Voivodeship, in northern Poland. Its seat is the village of Płoskinia, which lies approximately 15 kilometres (9 mi) south-east of Braniewo and 66 km (41 mi) north-west of the regional capital Olsztyn.

The gmina covers an area of 172.05 square kilometres (66.4 sq mi), and as of 2006 its total population is 2,707.

== Villages ==
Gmina Płoskinia contains the villages and settlements of Bliżewo, Chruściel, Czosnowo, Dąbrowa, Demity, Długobór, Długobór-Osada, Giedyle, Jarzębiec, Łojewo, Łozy, Lubnowo, Pielgrzymowo, Pierławki, Pierzchały, Piórkowo, Płoskinia, Płoskinia-Kolonia, Podlechy, Robuzy, Strubno, Stygajny, Szalmia, Tolkowiec, Trąbki and Wysoka Braniewska.

== Neighbouring gminas ==
Gmina Płoskinia is bordered by the gminas of Braniewo, Frombork, Młynary, Orneta, Pieniężno and Wilczęta.
