= Stygajny =

- Village
- Location within Poland
- Coordinates: 54°11′17″N 19°57′38″E
- Country: Poland
- Voivodeship: Warmian-Masurian
- County: Braniewo
- Gmina: Płoskinia
- Population: 60

Stygajny [stɨˈɡai̯nɨ] is a village in the administrative district of Gmina Płoskinia, within Braniewo County, Warmian-Masurian Voivodeship, in northern Poland.

Before 1772 the area was part of Kingdom of Poland, and in 1772–1945 it belonged to Prussia and Germany (East Prussia).
