= Trąbki, Warmian-Masurian Voivodeship =

Trąbki
- Village
- Location within Poland
- Coordinates: 54°16′46″N 19°50′44″E
- Country: Poland
- Voivodeship: Warmian-Masurian
- County: Braniewo
- Gmina: Płoskinia

Trąbki [ˈtrɔmpki] is a village in the administrative district of Gmina Płoskinia, within Braniewo County, Warmian-Masurian Voivodeship, in northern Poland.

Before 1772 the area was part of Kingdom of Poland, and in 1772–1945 it belonged to Prussia and Germany (East Prussia).
