= Prątnik =

- Settlement
- Location within Poland
- Coordinates: 54°21′18″N 19°48′24″E
- Country: Poland
- Voivodeship: Warmian-Masurian
- County: Braniewo
- Gmina: Braniewo
- Population: 3

Prątnik [ˈprɔntnik] is a settlement in the administrative district of Gmina Braniewo, within Braniewo County, Warmian-Masurian Voivodeship, in northern Poland, close to the border with the Kaliningrad Oblast of Russia.
