= Różaniec, Gmina Braniewo =

Różaniec
- Village
- Location within Poland
- Coordinates: 54°23′59″N 19°43′26″E
- Country: Poland
- Voivodeship: Warmian-Masurian
- County: Braniewo
- Gmina: Braniewo
- Population: 34

Różaniec [ruˈʐaɲɛt͡s] is a village in the administrative district of Gmina Braniewo, within Braniewo County, Warmian-Masurian Voivodeship, in northern Poland, close to the border with the Kaliningrad Oblast of Russia.
