= Rentyny =

- Village
- Location within Poland
- Coordinates: 53°46′33″N 20°13′47″E
- Country: Poland
- Voivodeship: Warmian-Masurian
- County: Olsztyn
- Gmina: Gietrzwałd

Rentyny [rɛnˈtɨnɨ] is a village in the administrative district of Gmina Gietrzwałd, within Olsztyn County, Warmian-Masurian Voivodeship, in northern Poland.
