= Gmina Braniewo =

Gmina Braniewo Braniewo Commune
- Gmina
- Interactive map of Gmina Braniewo
- Coordinates (Braniewo): 54°23′N 19°50′E
- Country: Poland
- Voivodeship: Warmian-Masurian
- County: Braniewo
- Seat: Braniewo

Area
  - Total: 306.93 km^{2} (118.51 sq mi)

Population (2006)
  - Total: 6,400
  - Density: 21/km^{2} (54/sq mi)
- Website: http://gminabraniewo.pl/

Gmina Braniewo is a rural gmina (administrative district) in Braniewo County, Warmian-Masurian Voivodeship, in northern Poland, on the border with Russia. Its seat is the town of Braniewo, although the town is not part of the territory of the gmina.

The gmina covers an area of 306.93 square kilometres (118.5 sq mi), and as of 2006 its total population is 6,400.

== Villages ==
Gmina Braniewo contains the villages and settlements of Bemowizna, Bobrowiec, Brzeszczyny, Cielętnik, Działy, Elżbiecin, Garbina, Glinka, Goleszewo, Grodzie, Gronówko, Gronowo, Grzechotki, Grzędowo, Jarocin, Józefowo, Kalina, Kalinówek, Kiersy, Klejnówko, Klejnowo, Krasnolipie, Krzewno, Lipowina, Maciejewo, Marcinkowo, Mikołajewo, Młoteczno, Nowa Pasłęka, Pęciszewo, Podgórze, Podleśne, Prątnik, Prętki, Rogity, Różaniec, Rudłowo, Rusy, Rydzówka, Stara Pasłęka, Stępień, Strubiny, Świętochowo, Szyleny, Ujście, Ułowo, Wielewo, Wikielec, Wilki, Wola Lipowska, Zakrzewiec, Zawierz, Żelazna Góra and Zgoda.

== Neighbouring gminas ==
Gmina Braniewo is bordered by the town of Braniewo and by the gminas of Frombork, Lelkowo, Pieniężno and Płoskinia. It also borders Russia (Kaliningrad oblast).
