= Nowy Młyn, Olsztyn County =

Nowy Młyn
- Settlement
- Location within Poland
- Coordinates: 53°46′39″N 20°11′21″E
- Country: Poland
- Voivodeship: Warmian-Masurian
- County: Olsztyn
- Gmina: Gietrzwałd

Nowy Młyn [ˈnɔvɨ ˈmwɨn] is a settlement in the administrative district of Gmina Gietrzwałd, within Olsztyn County, Warmian-Masurian Voivodeship, in northern Poland.

Before 1772 the area was part of Kingdom of Poland, and in 1772–1945 it belonged to Prussia and Germany (East Prussia).
