= Siła, Warmian-Masurian Voivodeship =

Siła
- Settlement
- Location within Poland
- Coordinates: 53°42′54″N 20°22′24″E
- Country: Poland
- Voivodeship: Warmian-Masurian
- County: Olsztyn
- Gmina: Gietrzwałd

Siła [ˈɕiwa] is a settlement in the administrative district of Gmina Gietrzwałd, within Olsztyn County, Warmian-Masurian Voivodeship, in northern Poland.
