= Kudypy, Olsztyn County =

Kudypy
- Village
- Location within Poland
- Coordinates: 53°45′56″N 20°23′3″E
- Country: Poland
- Voivodeship: Warmian-Masurian
- County: Olsztyn
- Gmina: Gietrzwałd
- Population: 30

Kudypy [kuˈdɨpɨ] is a village in the administrative district of Gmina Gietrzwałd, within Olsztyn County, Warmian-Masurian Voivodeship, in northern Poland.

Before 1772 the area was part of Kingdom of Poland, and in 1772–1945 it belonged to Prussia and Germany (East Prussia).
