= Tomarynki =

- Settlement
- Location within Poland
- Coordinates: 53°44′01″N 20°12′24″E
- Country: Poland
- Voivodeship: Warmian-Masurian
- County: Olsztyn
- Gmina: Gietrzwałd

Tomarynki [tɔmaˈrɨnki] is a settlement in the administrative district of Gmina Gietrzwałd, within Olsztyn County, Warmian-Masurian Voivodeship, in northern Poland.
