= Gronowo, Braniewo County =

Gronowo
- Village
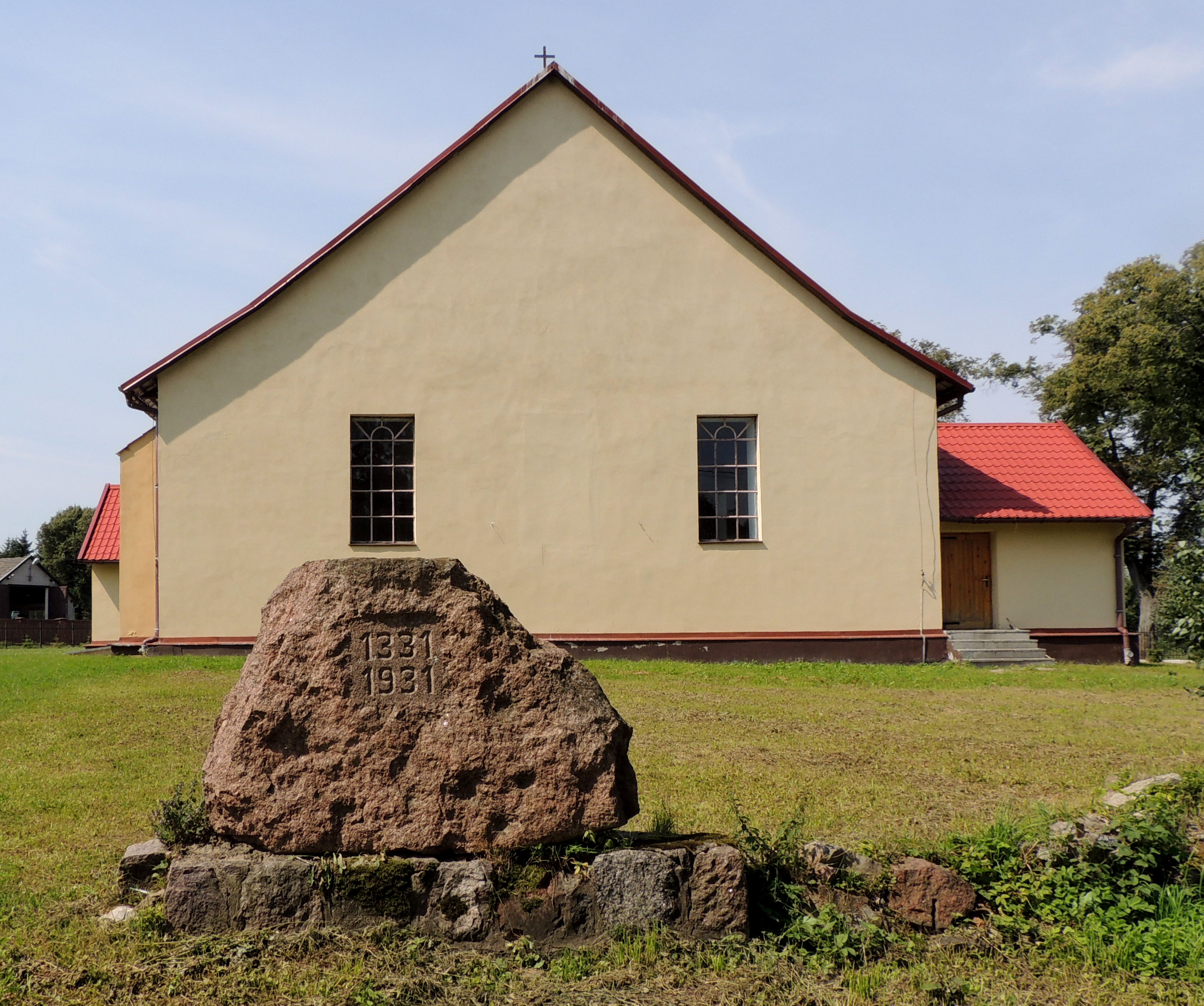
- Church in Gronowo

- Location within Poland
- Coordinates: 54°25′46″N 19°53′28″E
- Country: Poland
- Voivodeship: Warmian-Masurian
- County: Braniewo
- Gmina: Braniewo
- First mentioned: 1331
- Population: 119
- Time zone: UTC+1 (CET)
  - Summer (DST): UTC+2 (CEST)
- Vehicle registration: NBR

Gronowo [ɡrɔˈnɔvɔ] is a village in the administrative district of Gmina Braniewo, within Braniewo County, Warmian-Masurian Voivodeship, in northern Poland, close to the border with the Kaliningrad Oblast of Russia.
