= Pierzchały, Warmian-Masurian Voivodeship =

Pierzchały
- Village
- Location within Poland
- Coordinates: 54°18′N 19°51′E
- Country: Poland
- Voivodeship: Warmian-Masurian
- County: Braniewo
- Gmina: Płoskinia

Pierzchały [pjɛʂˈxawɨ] is a village in the administrative district of Gmina Płoskinia, within Braniewo County, Warmian-Masurian Voivodeship, in northern Poland.
