= Marcinkowo =

Marcinkowo may refer to:

- Marcinkowo, Greater Poland Voivodeship (west-central Poland)
- Marcinkowo, Inowrocław County in Kuyavian-Pomeranian Voivodeship (north-central Poland)
- Marcinkowo, Mogilno County in Kuyavian-Pomeranian Voivodeship (north-central Poland)
- Marcinkowo, Braniewo County in Warmian-Masurian Voivodeship (north Poland)
- Marcinkowo, Mrągowo County in Warmian-Masurian Voivodeship (north Poland)
- Marcinkowo, Olsztyn County in Warmian-Masurian Voivodeship (north Poland)
- Marcinkowo, Ostróda County in Warmian-Masurian Voivodeship (north Poland)
