= Chruściel =

- Village
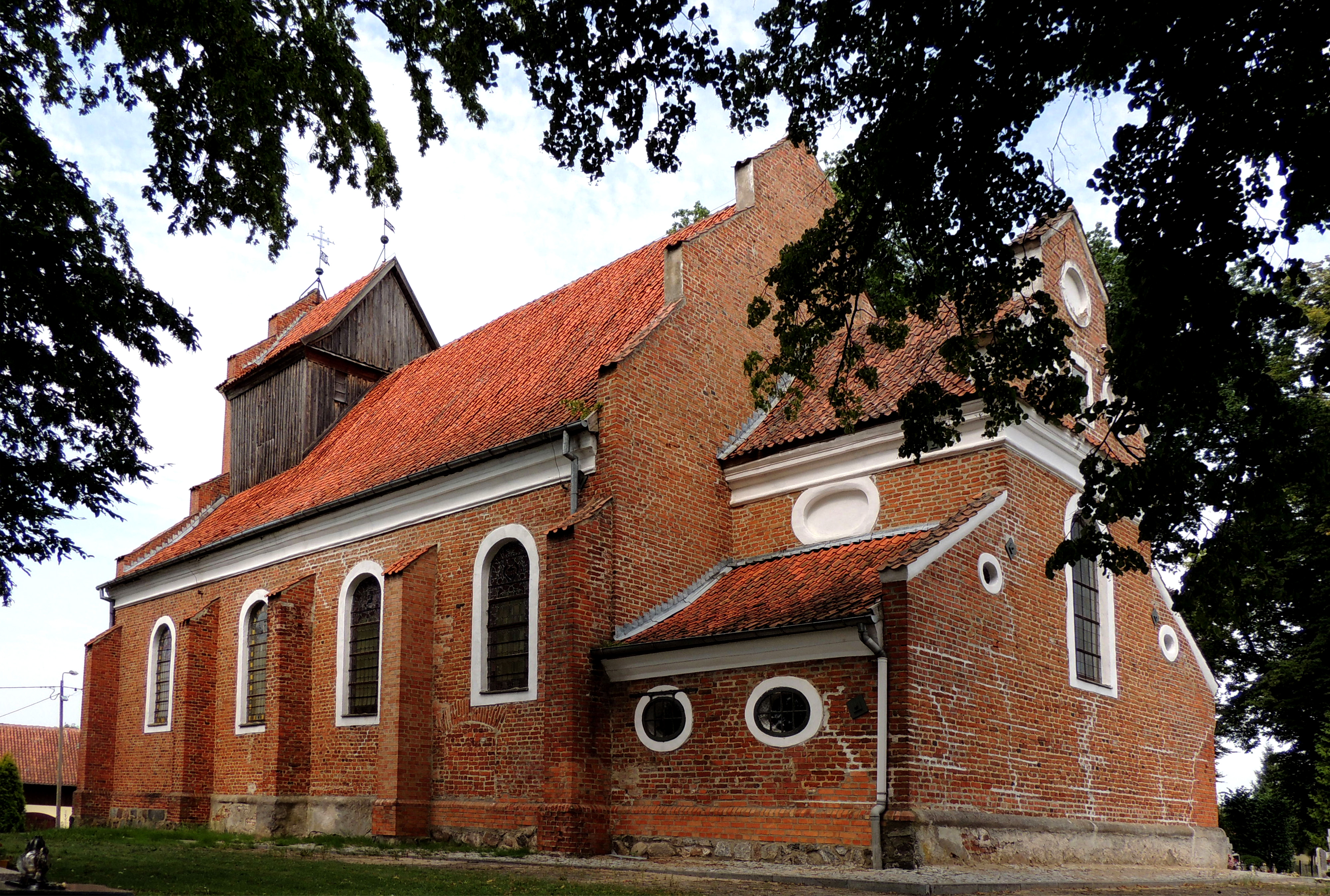
- Baroque Holy Trinity church in Chruściel
- Interactive map of Chruściel
- Location within Poland
- Coordinates: 54°15′24″N 19°48′43″E
- Country: Poland
- Voivodeship: Warmian-Masurian
- County: Braniewo
- Gmina: Płoskinia
- Population: 365
- Time zone: UTC+1 (CET)
  - Summer (DST): UTC+2 (CEST)
- Vehicle registration: NBR

Chruściel [ˈxruɕt͡ɕɛl] is a village in the administrative district of Gmina Płoskinia, within Braniewo County, Warmian-Masurian Voivodeship, in northern Poland. It is located in the historic region of Warmia.
