= Młoteczno =

- Village
- Location within Poland
- Coordinates: 54°24′15″N 19°51′23″E
- Country: Poland
- Voivodeship: Warmian-Masurian
- County: Braniewo
- Gmina: Braniewo
- Population: 295

Młoteczno [mwɔˈtɛt͡ʂnɔ] is a village in the administrative district of Gmina Braniewo, within Braniewo County, Warmian-Masurian Voivodeship, in northern Poland, close to the border with the Kaliningrad Oblast of Russia.

The population of Młoteczno in 2021 was 195.

In the village, several archaeological treasures were discovered between 1873 and 1917, including at least 17 pieces of gold and silver such as a medal from the reign of Constantius II, jewelry and metal tools.
