= Glinka, Braniewo County =

Glinka
- Village
- Location within Poland
- Coordinates: 54°20′44″N 19°48′1″E
- Country: Poland
- Voivodeship: Warmian-Masurian
- County: Braniewo
- Gmina: Braniewo
- Population: 192

Glinka [ˈɡlinka] is a village in the administrative district of Gmina Braniewo, within Braniewo County, Warmian-Masurian Voivodeship, in northern Poland, close to the border with the Kaliningrad Oblast of Russia.
