= Różaniec =

Różaniec may refer to the following places in Poland:

- Różaniec, Lower Silesian Voivodeship (south-west Poland)
- Różaniec, Lublin Voivodeship (east Poland)
- Różaniec, Gmina Braniewo in Warmian-Masurian Voivodeship (north Poland)
- Różaniec, Gmina Pieniężno in Warmian-Masurian Voivodeship (north Poland)
