= Gronity =

- Village
- Location within Poland
- Coordinates: 53°44′56″N 20°23′55″E
- Country: Poland
- Voivodeship: Warmian-Masurian
- County: Olsztyn
- Gmina: Gietrzwałd

Population
  - Total: 600
- Postal code: 11-036
- Vehicle registration: NOL
- Website: http://gronity.pl/artykuly/warmia-ziemia.html

Gronity [ɡrɔˈnitɨ] is a village in the administrative district of Gmina Gietrzwałd, within Olsztyn County, Warmian-Masurian Voivodeship, in northern Poland. It is located in the region of Warmia.
