= Zdrojek, Olsztyn County =

Zdrojek
- Settlement
- Location within Poland
- Coordinates: 53°43′51″N 20°09′37″E
- Country: Poland
- Voivodeship: Warmian-Masurian
- County: Olsztyn
- Gmina: Gietrzwałd

Zdrojek [ˈzdrɔjɛk] is a settlement in the administrative district of Gmina Gietrzwałd, within Olsztyn County, Warmian-Masurian Voivodeship, in northern Poland.
