= Podlejki =

Podlejki Podleiken
- Village
- Location within Poland
- Coordinates: 53°43′N 20°11′E
- Country: Poland
- Voivodeship: Warmian-Masurian
- County: Olsztyn
- Gmina: Gietrzwałd

Podlejki [pɔdˈlɛi̯ki] (German Podleiken) is a village in the administrative district of Gmina Gietrzwałd, within Olsztyn County, Warmian-Masurian Voivodeship, in northern Poland.
