= Płoskinia =

- Village
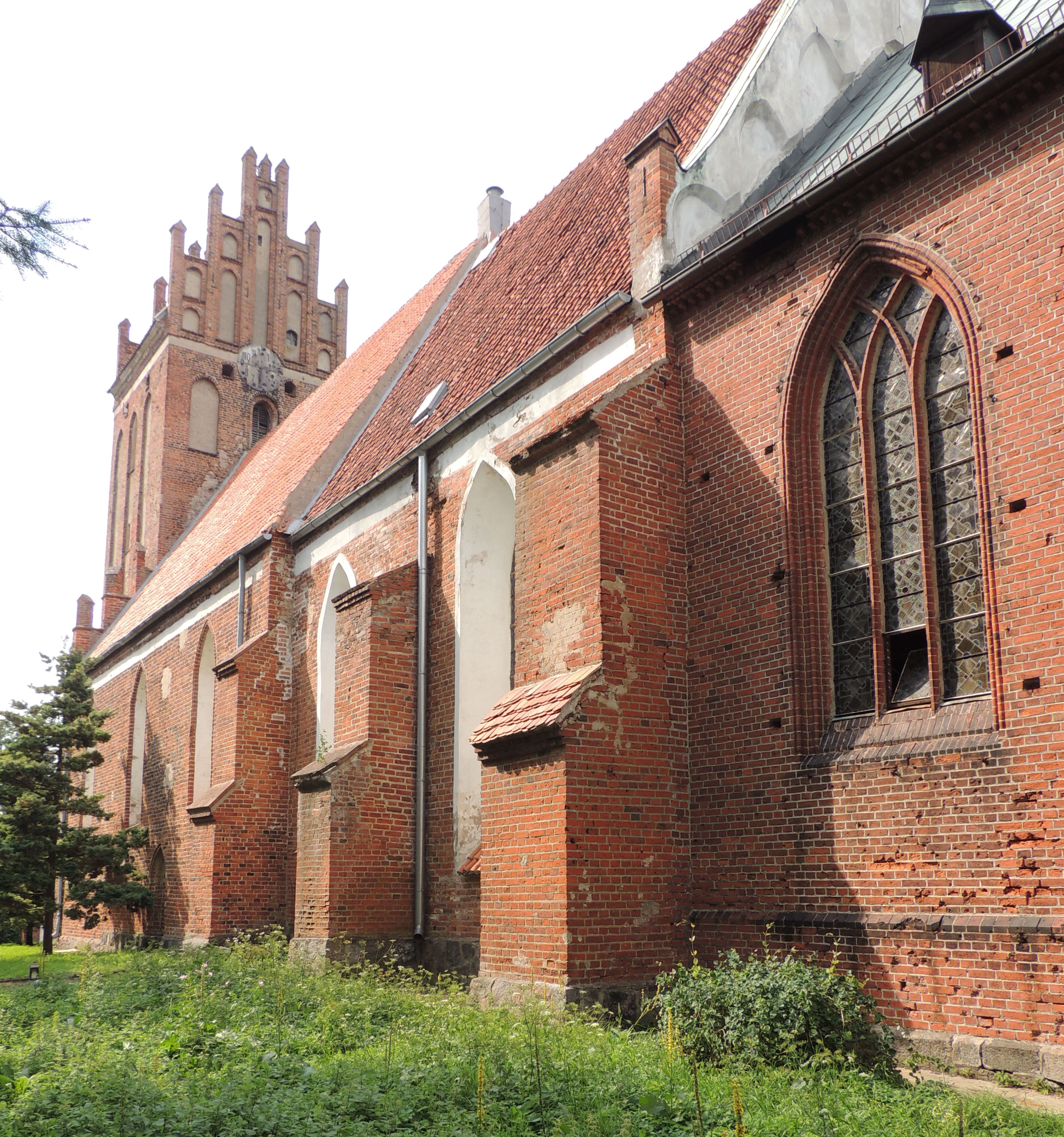
- Saint Catherine church in Płoskinia
- Interactive map of Płoskinia
- Location within Poland
- Coordinates: 54°16′10″N 19°56′18″E
- Country: Poland
- Voivodeship: Warmian-Masurian
- County: Braniewo
- Gmina: Płoskinia
- Population: 460
- Time zone: UTC+1 (CET)
  - Summer (DST): UTC+2 (CEST)
- Vehicle registration: NBR

Płoskinia (Polish pronunciation: [pwɔsˈkiɲa]) is a village in Braniewo County, Warmian-Masurian Voivodeship, a part of northern Poland. It is the seat of the Gmina (administrative district) called Gmina Płoskinia.
