= Śródka, Warmian-Masurian Voivodeship =

Śródka
- Village
- Location within Poland
- Coordinates: 53°43′N 20°15′E
- Country: Poland
- Voivodeship: Warmian-Masurian
- County: Olsztyn
- Gmina: Gietrzwałd

Śródka [ˈɕrutka] is a village in the administrative district of Gmina Gietrzwałd, within Olsztyn County, Warmian-Masurian Voivodeship, in northern Poland.
