= Sząbruk =

- Village
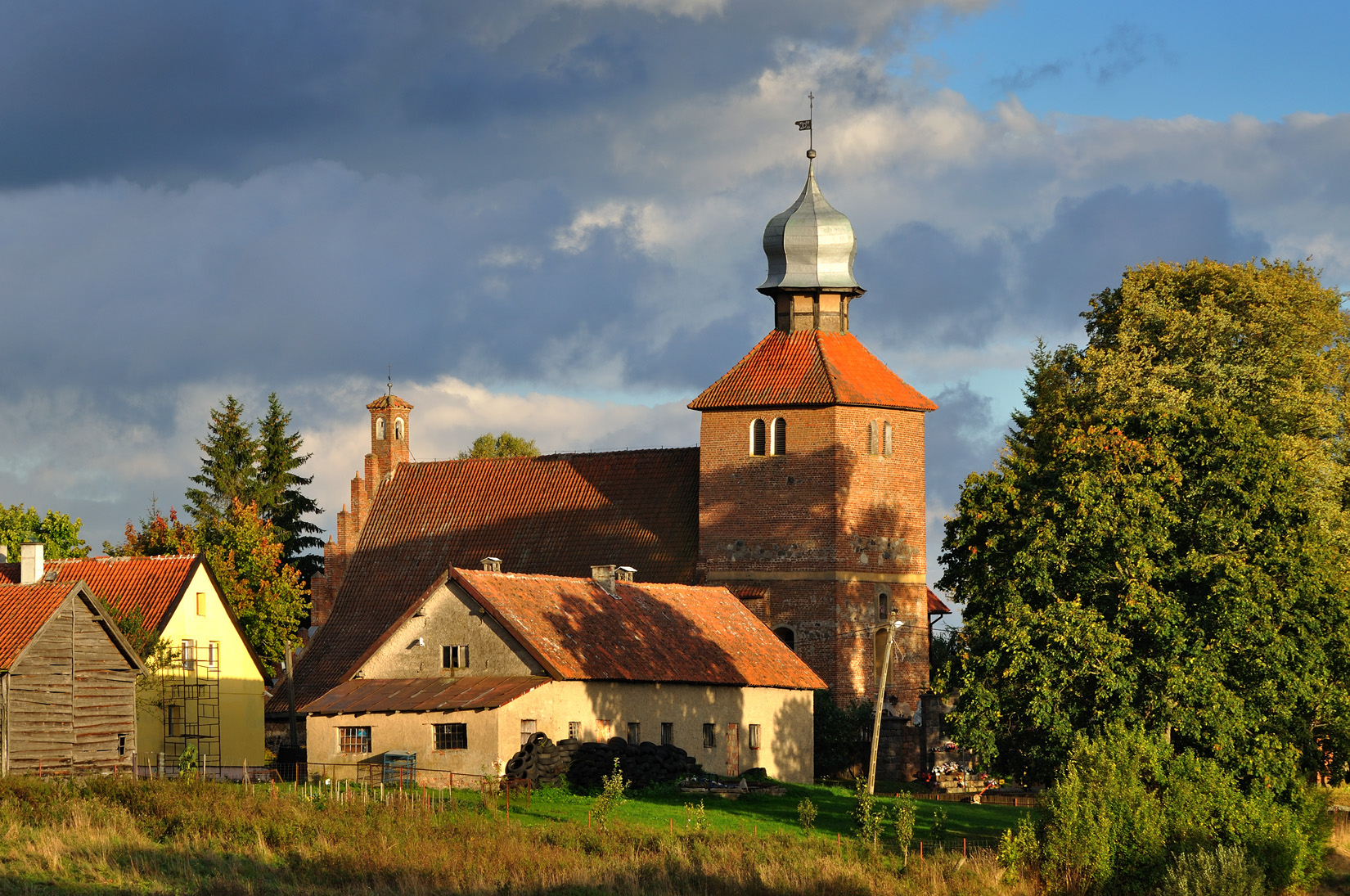
- Saints Nicholas and John the Evangelist church in Sząbruk

- Location within Poland
- Coordinates: 53°43′27″N 20°20′6″E
- Country: Poland
- Voivodeship: Warmian-Masurian
- County: Olsztyn
- Gmina: Gietrzwałd

Population
  - Total: 970

Sząbruk [ˈʂɔmbruk] is a village in the administrative district of Gmina Gietrzwałd, within Olsztyn County, Warmian-Masurian Voivodeship, in northern Poland.
