= Łęgucki Młyn =

- Settlement
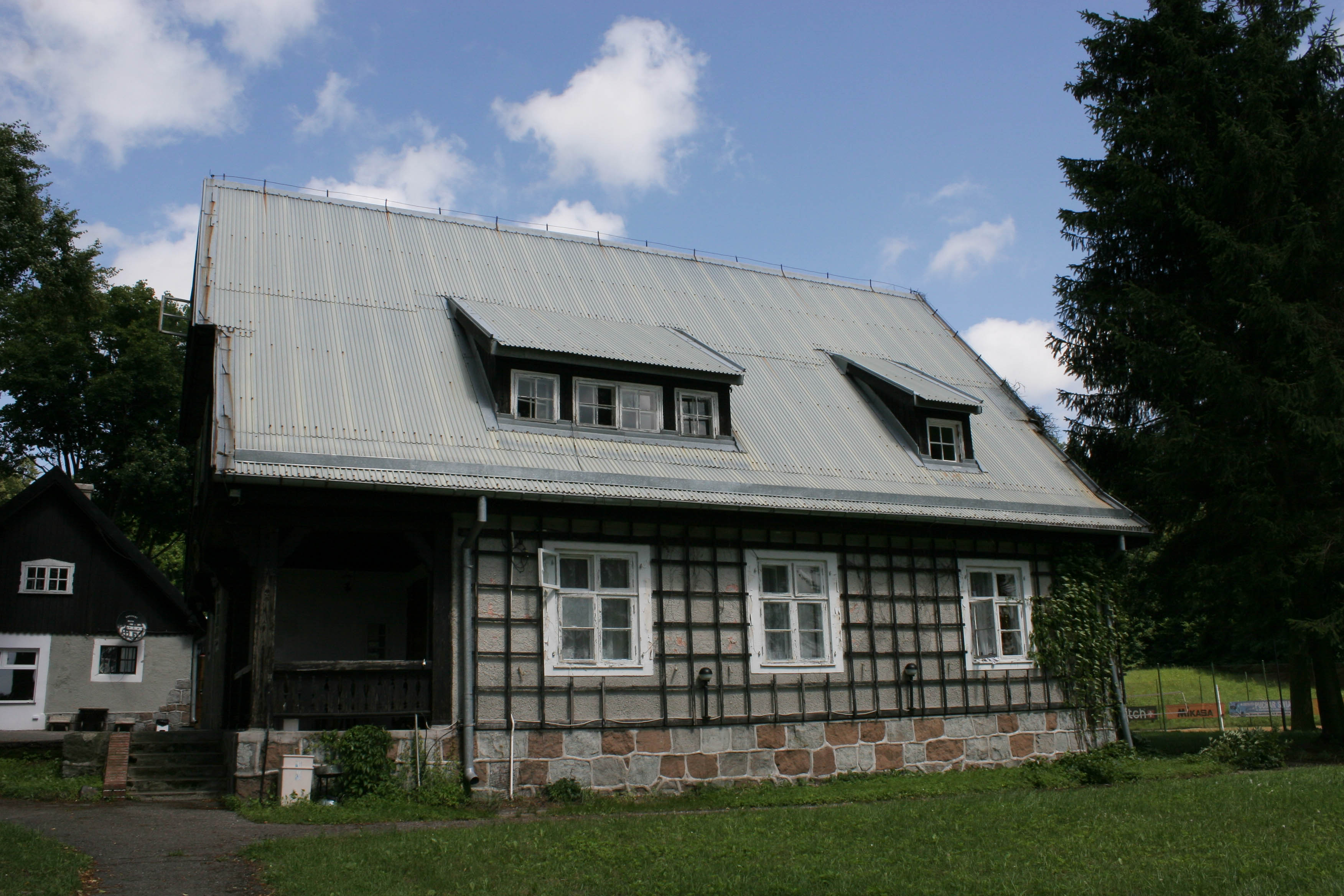

- Location within Poland
- Coordinates: 53°45′42″N 20°09′14″E
- Country: Poland
- Voivodeship: Warmian-Masurian
- County: Olsztyn
- Gmina: Gietrzwałd
- Time zone: UTC+1 (CET)
  - Summer (DST): UTC+2 (CEST)
- Vehicle registration: NOL

Łęgucki Młyn [wɛnˈɡut͡ski ˈmwɨn] is a settlement in the administrative district of Gmina Gietrzwałd, within Olsztyn County, Warmian-Masurian Voivodeship, in northern Poland. It is located in the historic region of Warmia.
