= Gmina Frombork =

Gmina Frombork Frombork Commune
- Gmina
- Flag Coat of arms
- Interactive map of Gmina Frombork
- Coordinates (Frombork): 54°21′N 19°41′E
- Country: Poland
- Voivodeship: Warmian-Masurian
- County: Braniewo
- Seat: Frombork

Area
  - Total: 125.82 km^{2} (48.58 sq mi)

Population (2006)
  - Total: 3,791
  - Density: 30.13/km^{2} (78.04/sq mi)
  - Urban: 2,529
  - Rural: 1,262
- Website: http://www.frombork.pl/

Gmina Frombork is an urban-rural gmina (administrative district) in Braniewo County, Warmian-Masurian Voivodeship, in northern Poland. Its seat is the town of Frombork, which lies approximately 11 kilometres (7 mi) west of Braniewo and 83 km (52 mi) north-west of the regional capital Olsztyn.

The gmina covers an area of 125.82 square kilometres (48.6 sq mi), and as of 2006 its total population is 3,791 (out of which the population of Frombork amounts to 2,529, and the population of the rural part of the gmina is 1,262).

== Neighbouring gminas ==
Gmina Frombork is bordered by the gminas of Braniewo, Młynary, Płoskinia and Tolkmicko. It also lies next to the Vistula Lagoon.

== Villages ==
The gmina contains the following villages having the status of sołectwo: Baranówka, Biedkowo, Bogdany, Drewnowo, Jędrychowo, Krzyżewo, Krzywiec, Narusa, Ronin and Wierzno Wielkie.

There is also the village of Nowiny, which does not have the status of sołectwo.
