= Biesal =

Biesal Biessellen
- Village
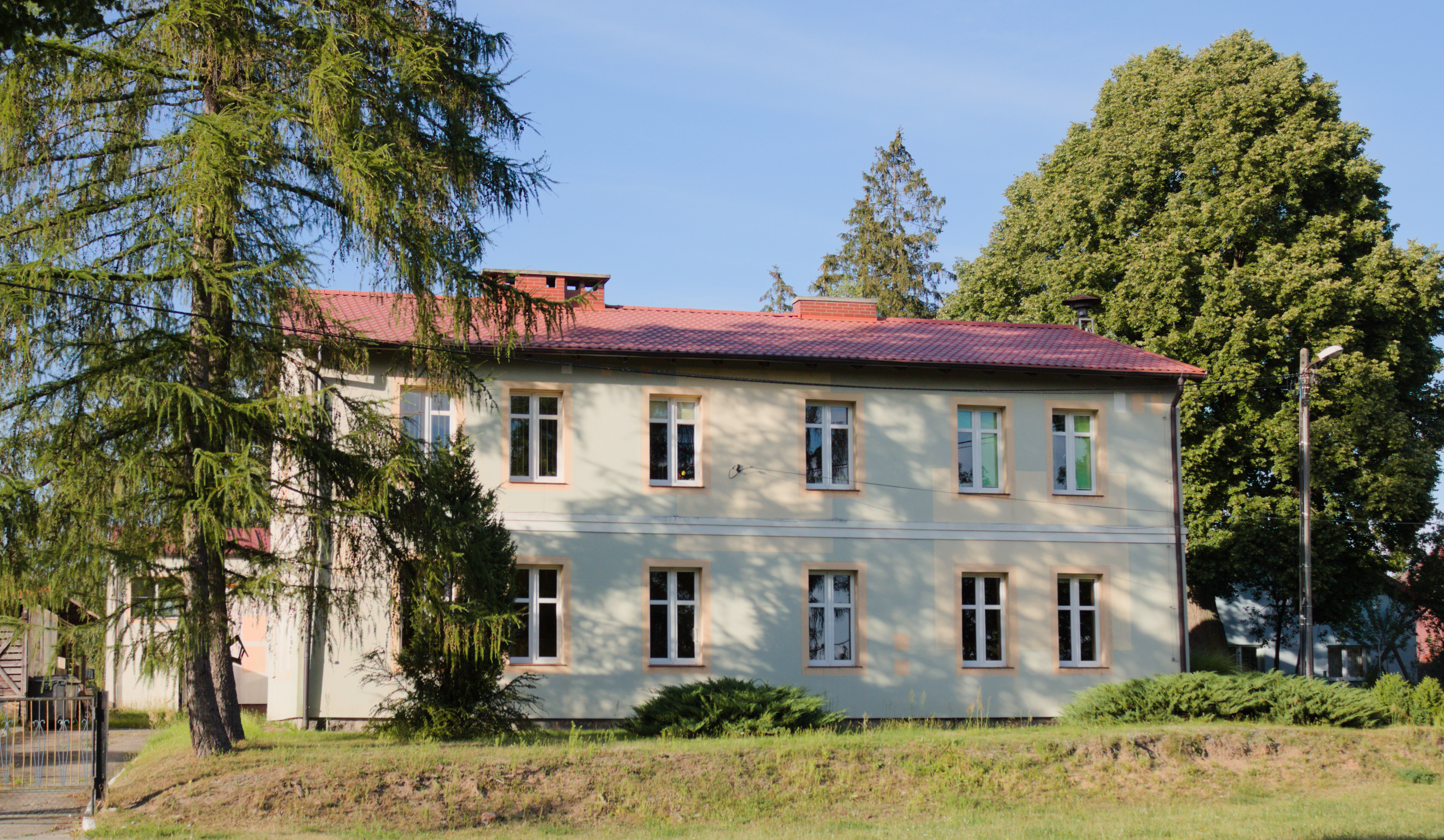
- School in the village

- Location within Poland
- Coordinates: 53°43′16″N 20°11′53″E
- Country: Poland
- Voivodeship: Warmian-Masurian
- County: Olsztyn
- Gmina: Gietrzwałd

Population
  - Total: 569

Biesal [ˈbjɛsal] (German: Biessellen) is a village in the administrative district of Gmina Gietrzwałd, within Olsztyn County, Warmian-Masurian Voivodeship, in northern Poland.

== Notable people ==
- Adam Tomasiak, Polish rower
