= Guzowy Młyn =

Polish village in Warmian-Masurian Voivodeship, Poland

- Village
- Location within Poland
- Coordinates: 53°41′24″N 20°14′20″E
- Country: Poland
- Voivodeship: Warmian-Masurian
- County: Olsztyn
- Gmina: Gietrzwałd
- Population: 70

Guzowy Młyn [ɡuˈzɔvɨ ˈmwɨn] is a village in the administrative district of Gmina Gietrzwałd, within Olsztyn County, Warmian-Masurian Voivodeship, in northern Poland.
