= Guzowy Piec =

- Village
- Location within Poland
- Coordinates: 53°41′N 20°13′E
- Country: Poland
- Voivodeship: Warmian-Masurian
- County: Olsztyn
- Gmina: Gietrzwałd

Guzowy Piec [ɡuˈzɔvɨ ˈpjɛt͡s] is a village in the administrative district of Gmina Gietrzwałd, within Olsztyn County, Warmian-Masurian Voivodeship, in northern Poland.
