= Gmina Gietrzwałd =

Gmina Gietrzwałd Gietrzwałd Commune
- Gmina
- Interactive map of Gmina Gietrzwałd
- Coordinates (Gietrzwałd): 53°44′51″N 20°14′8″E
- Country: Poland
- Voivodeship: Warmian-Masurian
- County: Olsztyn County
- Seat: Gietrzwałd

Area
  - Total: 174.13 km^{2} (67.23 sq mi)

Population (2006)
  - Total: 5,315
  - Density: 30.52/km^{2} (79.05/sq mi)
- Website: http://www.gietrzwald.pl/

Gmina Gietrzwałd is a rural gmina (administrative district) in Olsztyn County, Warmian-Masurian Voivodeship, in northern Poland. Its seat is the village of Gietrzwałd, which lies approximately 18 kilometres (11 mi) west of the regional capital Olsztyn.

The gmina covers an area of 174.13 square kilometres (67.2 sq mi), and as of 2006 its total population is 5,315.

== Villages ==
Gmina Gietrzwałd contains the villages and settlements of Barduń, Barwiny, Biesal, Cegłowo, Dłużki, Gietrzwałd, Grazymy, Gronity, Guzowy Młyn, Guzowy Piec, Jadaminy, Kudypy, Łajsy, Łęgucki Młyn, Łęguty, Łopkajny, Łupstych, Naglady, Naterki, Nowy Młyn, Parwółki, Pęglity, Podlejki, Rapaty, Rentyny, Salminek (German: Sallmeien), Siła, Smoleń, Śródka, Sząbruk, Tomarynki, Tomaryny, Unieszewo, Woryty, Zaskwierki and Zdrojek.

== Neighbouring gminas ==
Gmina Gietrzwałd is bordered by the city of Olsztyn and by the gminas of Jonkowo, Łukta, Olsztynek, Ostróda and Stawiguda.
