= Marcinkowice =

Marcinkowice may refer to the following places in Poland:

- Marcinkowice, Lower Silesian Voivodeship (south-west Poland)
- Marcinkowice, Miechów County in Lesser Poland Voivodeship (south Poland)
- Marcinkowice, Nowy Sącz County in Lesser Poland Voivodeship (south Poland)
- Marcinkowice, Kazimierza County in Świętokrzyskie Voivodeship (south-central Poland)
- Marcinkowice, Opatów County in Świętokrzyskie Voivodeship (south-central Poland)
- Marcinkowice, Tarnów County in Lesser Poland Voivodeship (south Poland)
- Marcinkowice, West Pomeranian Voivodeship (north-west Poland)
