= Braniewo County =

Braniewo County Powiat braniewski
- County
- Flag Coat of arms

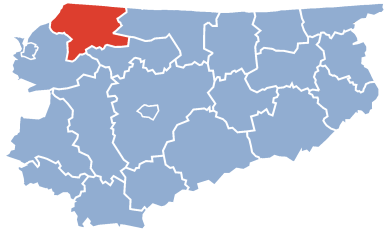
- Location within the voivodeship

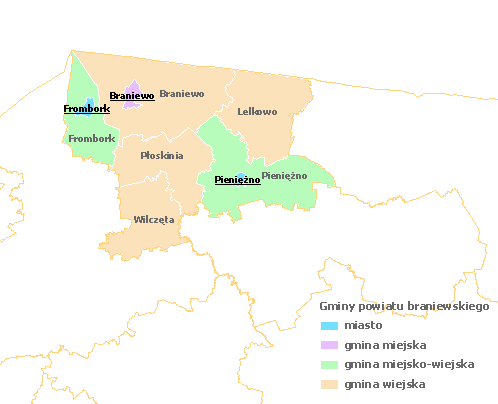
- Division into gminas
- Coordinates (Braniewo): 54°23′N 19°50′E
- Country: Poland
- Voivodeship: Warmian-Masurian
- Seat: Braniewo
- Gminas: Total 7 (incl. 1 urban): Braniewo; Gmina Braniewo; Gmina Frombork; Gmina Lelkowo; Gmina Pieniężno; Gmina Płoskinia; Gmina Wilczęta

Area
  - Total: 1,204.54 km^{2} (465.08 sq mi)

Population (2019)
  - Total: 41,223
  - Density: 34.223/km^{2} (88.637/sq mi)
  - Urban: 22,093
  - Rural: 19,130
- Car plates: NBR
- Website: www.powiat-braniewo.pl

Braniewo County (Polish: powiat braniewski) is a unit of territorial administration and local government (powiat) in Warmian-Masurian Voivodeship, northern Poland, on the border with Russia. It came into being on January 1, 1999, as a result of the Polish local government reforms passed in 1998. Its administrative seat and largest town is Braniewo, which lies 80 kilometres (50 mi) north-west of the regional capital Olsztyn. The county also contains the towns of Pieniężno, lying 27 km (17 mi) south-east of Braniewo, and Frombork, 11 km (7 mi) west of Braniewo.

The county covers an area of 1,204.54 square kilometres (465.1 sq mi). As of 2019 its total population is 41,223, out of which the population of Braniewo is 17,875, that of Pieniężno is 2,271, that of Frombork is 2,332, and the rural population is 19,130.

== Neighbouring counties ==
Braniewo County is bordered by Bartoszyce County and Lidzbark County to the east, and Elbląg County to the south-west. It also borders Russia (Kaliningrad Oblast) to the north.

== Administrative division ==
The county is subdivided into seven gminas (one urban, two urban-rural and four rural). These are listed in the following table, in descending order of population.

Gmina	Type	Area (km^{2})	Population (2019)	Seat
Braniewo	urban	12.4	17,040	
Gmina Pieniężno	urban-rural	241.4	6,208	Pieniężno
Gmina Braniewo	rural	306.9	6,062	Braniewo *
Gmina Frombork	urban-rural	125.8	3,575	Frombork
Gmina Wilczęta	rural	148.0	2,981	Wilczęta
Gmina Lelkowo	rural	198.0	2,854	Lelkowo
Gmina Płoskinia	rural	172.1	2,503	Płoskinia
* seat not part of the gmina
