= Mazuchy =

- Location within Poland
- Coordinates: 53°41′18″N 20°38′45″E
- Country: Poland
- Voivodeship: Warmian-Masurian
- County: Olsztyn
- Gmina: Purda
- Time zone: UTC+1 (CET)
  - Summer (DST): UTC+2 (CEST)
- Vehicle registration: NOL

Mazuchy is an abandoned settlement in the administrative district of Gmina Purda, within Olsztyn County, Warmian-Masurian Voivodeship, in northern Poland.

== History ==
In 1856, it had one household with six inhabitants.

Under Nazi Germany, in 1938, the village was renamed to Finkenwalde to erase traces of Polish origin.
