= Nowa Kaletka =

- Village
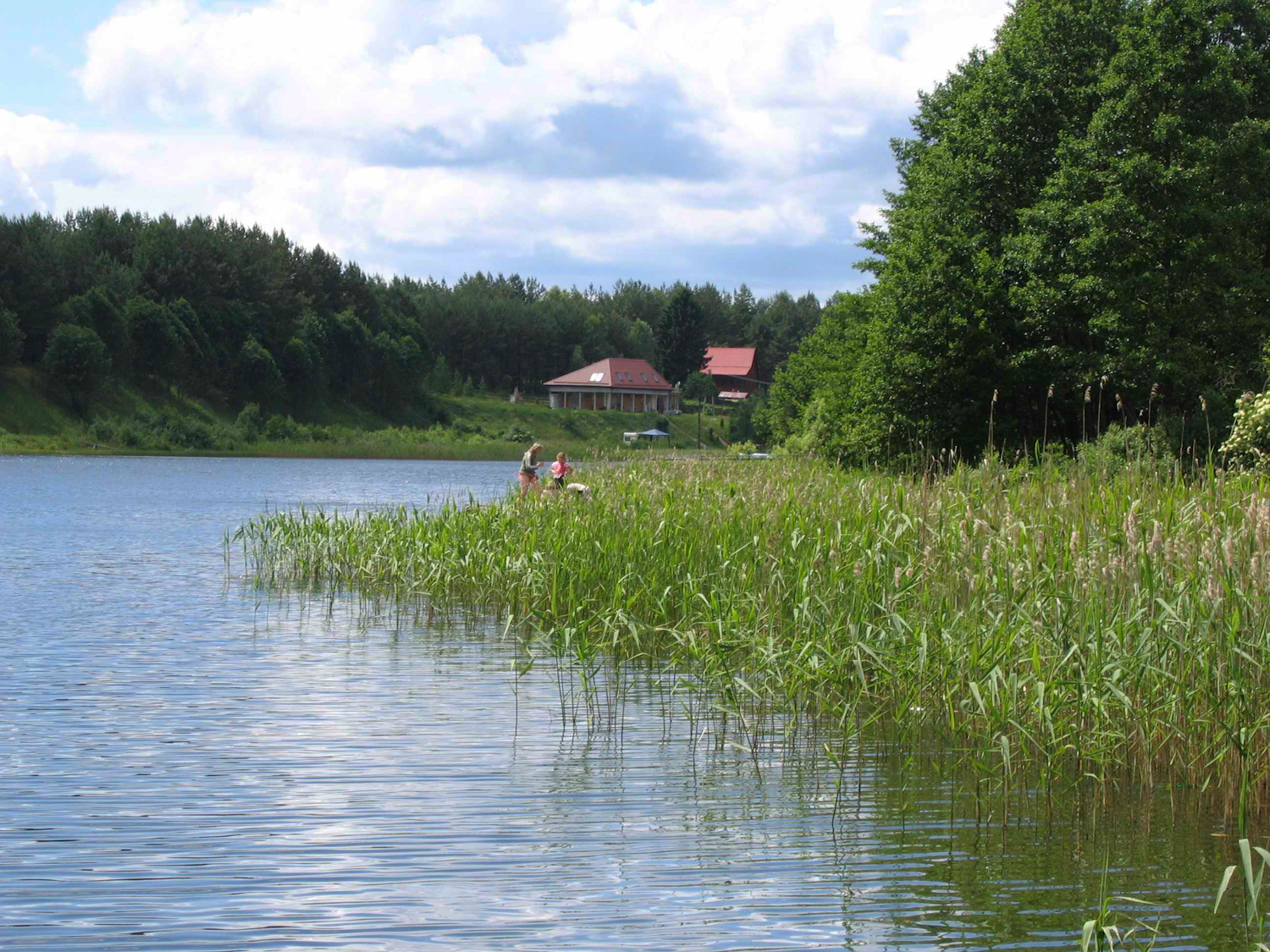
- Gim Lake in the village

- Location within Poland
- Coordinates: 53°35′1″N 20°32′48″E
- Country: Poland
- Voivodeship: Warmian-Masurian
- County: Olsztyn
- Gmina: Purda
- Elevation: 151 m (495 ft)
- Population: 400
- Time zone: UTC+1 (CET)
  - Summer (DST): UTC+2 (CEST)
- Area code: +48 89
- Vehicle registration: NOL

Nowa Kaletka [ˈnɔva kaˈlɛtka] is a village in the administrative district of Gmina Purda, within Olsztyn County, Warmian-Masurian Voivodeship, in northern Poland. It is located within the historic region of Warmia.

The village was founded in 1827 after being separated from the village of Kaletka.

The village's historic sights include the pre-war Polish school building and two typical Warmian old wayside shrines.

Polish folk poet and activist Michał Lengowski (1873–1967) was born in Nowa Kaletka.

== Gallery ==
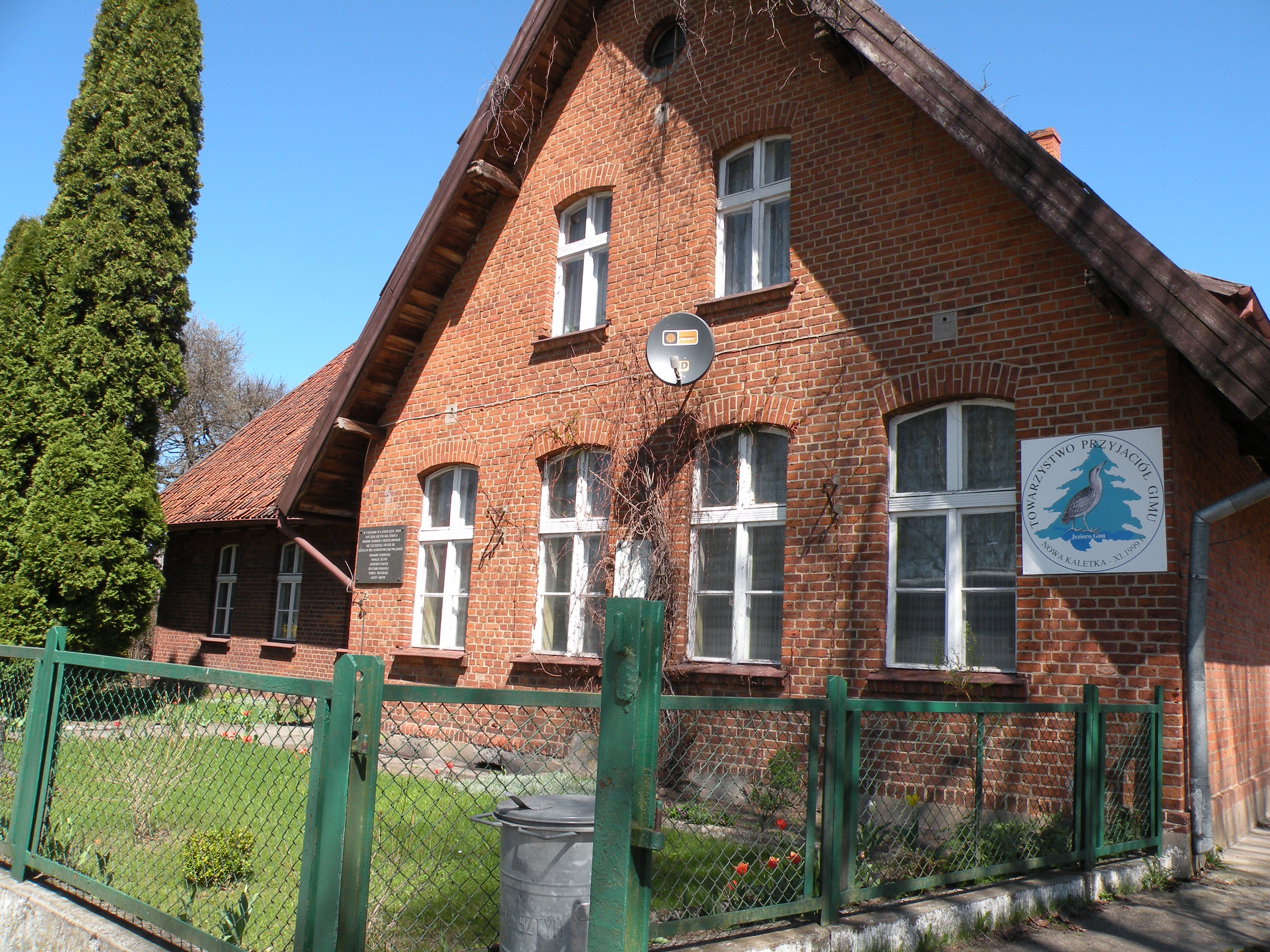
Pre-war Polish school

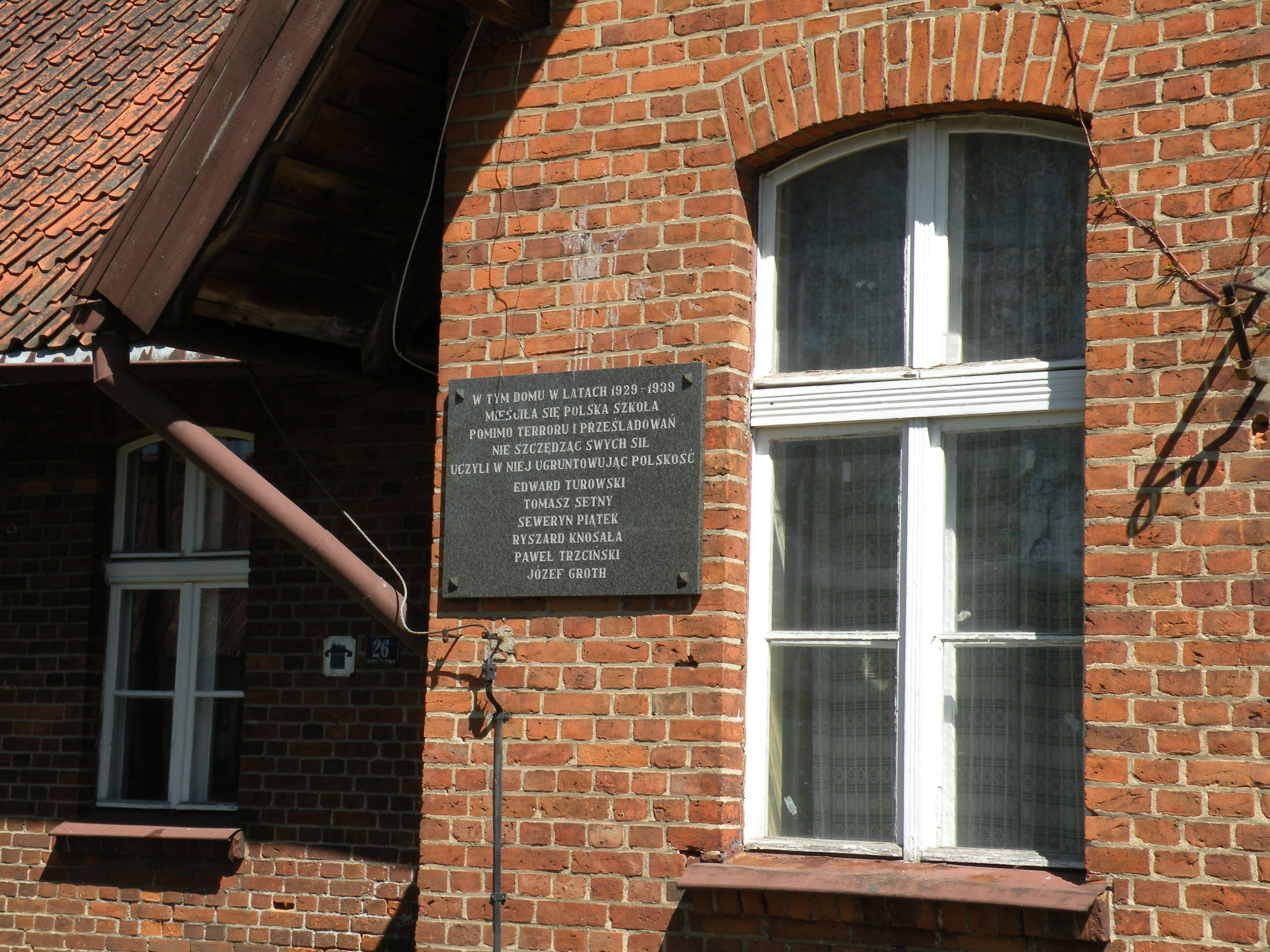
Plaque commemorating pre-war Polish school teachers

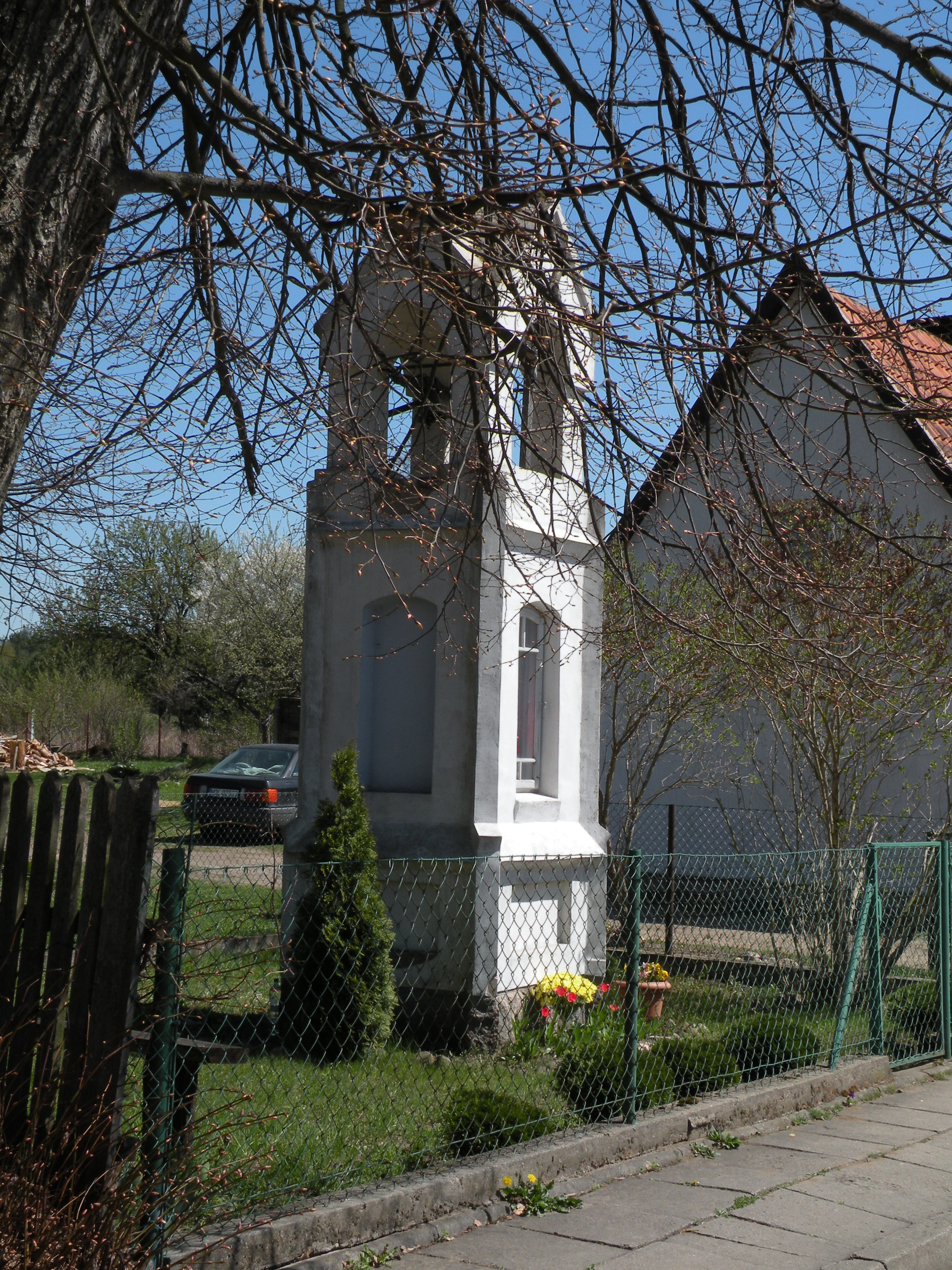
Warmian old wayside shrine
