= Linowo, Olsztyn County =

Linowo
- Village
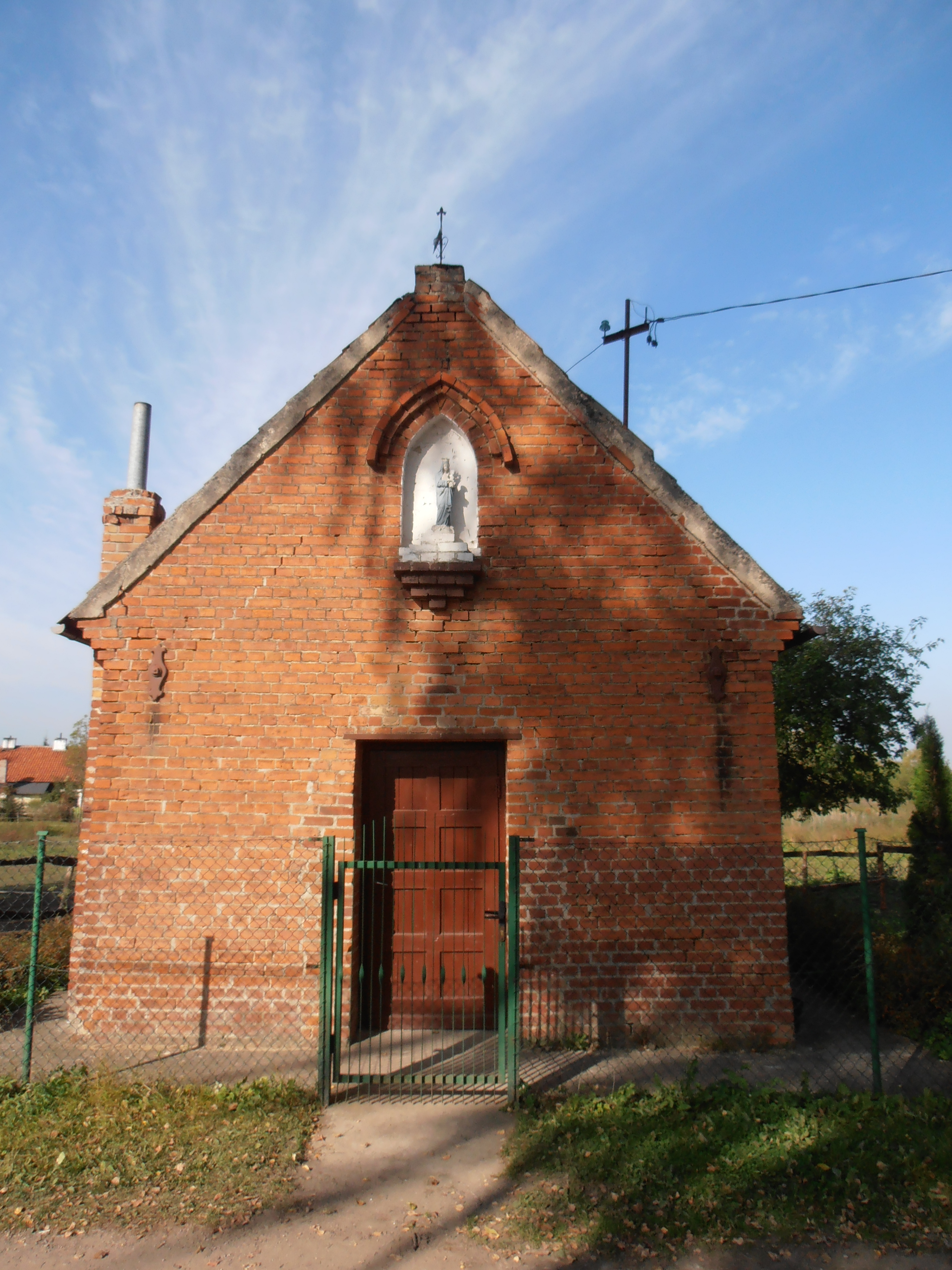
- Chapel in Linowo

- Location within Poland
- Coordinates: 53°44′N 20°34′E
- Country: Poland
- Voivodeship: Warmian-Masurian
- County: Olsztyn
- Gmina: Purda
- Population (2011): 73
- Time zone: UTC+1 (CET)
  - Summer (DST): UTC+2 (CEST)
- Postal code: 11-030
- Area code: +48 89
- Vehicle registration: NOL

Linowo ([liˈnɔvɔ]; German: Leynau, 1938–45 Leinau) is a village in the administrative district of Gmina Purda, within Olsztyn County, Warmian-Masurian Voivodeship, in northern Poland. It is located within historic Warmia.
