= Trękusek =

- Village
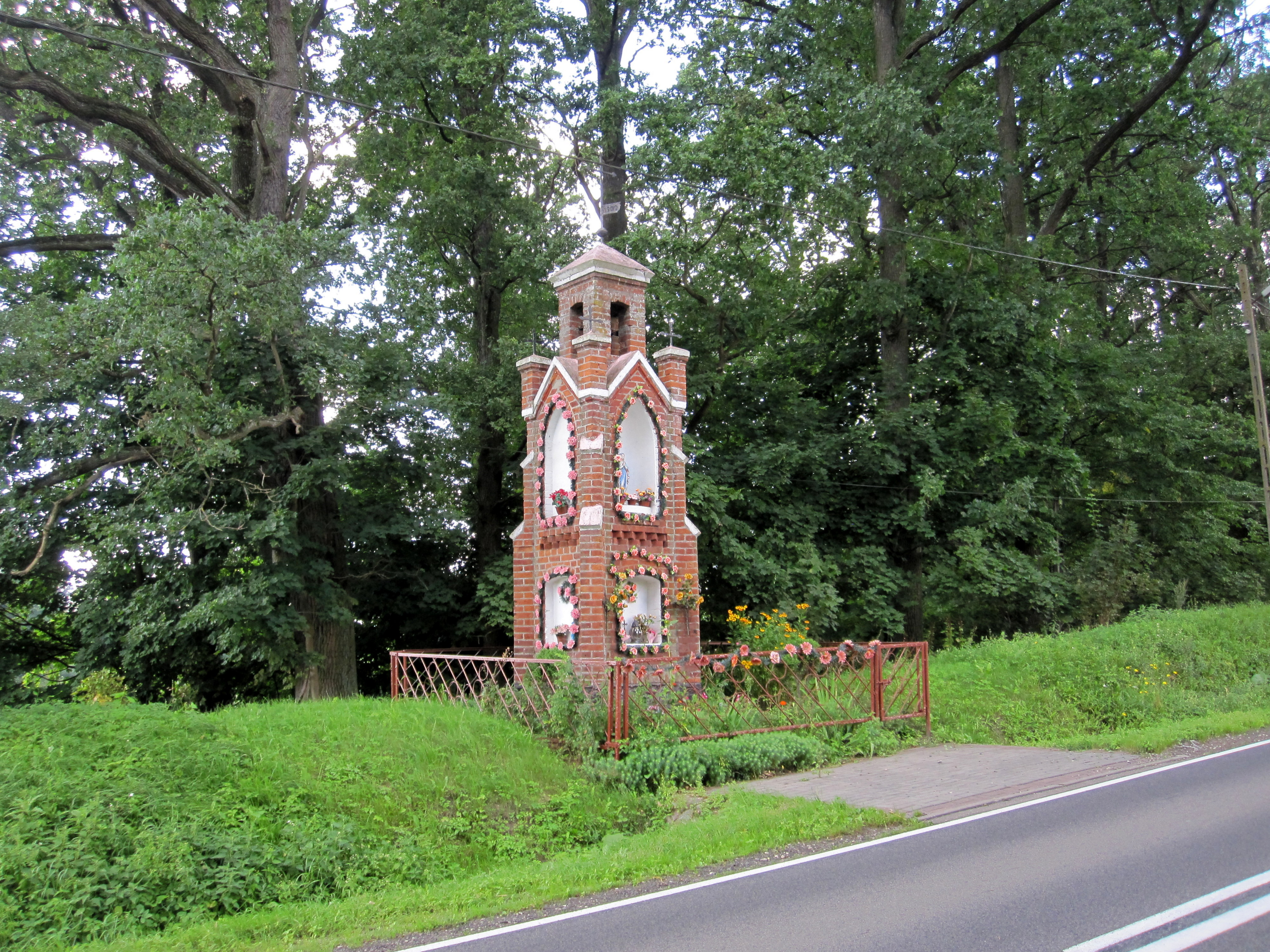
- Warmian wayside shrine

- Location within Poland
- Coordinates: 53°42′48″N 20°37′53″E
- Country: Poland
- Voivodeship: Warmian-Masurian
- County: Olsztyn
- Gmina: Purda
- Time zone: UTC+1 (CET)
  - Summer (DST): UTC+2 (CEST)
- Area code: +48 89
- Vehicle registration: NOL

Trękusek [trɛnˈkusɛk] is a village in the administrative district of Gmina Purda, within Olsztyn County, Warmian-Masurian Voivodeship, in northern Poland. It is located within the historic region of Warmia.

The village was founded in 1359.

The historic sights of Trękusek are the Warmian old wayside shrine and the ruins of an early 20th-century manor.

== Gallery ==
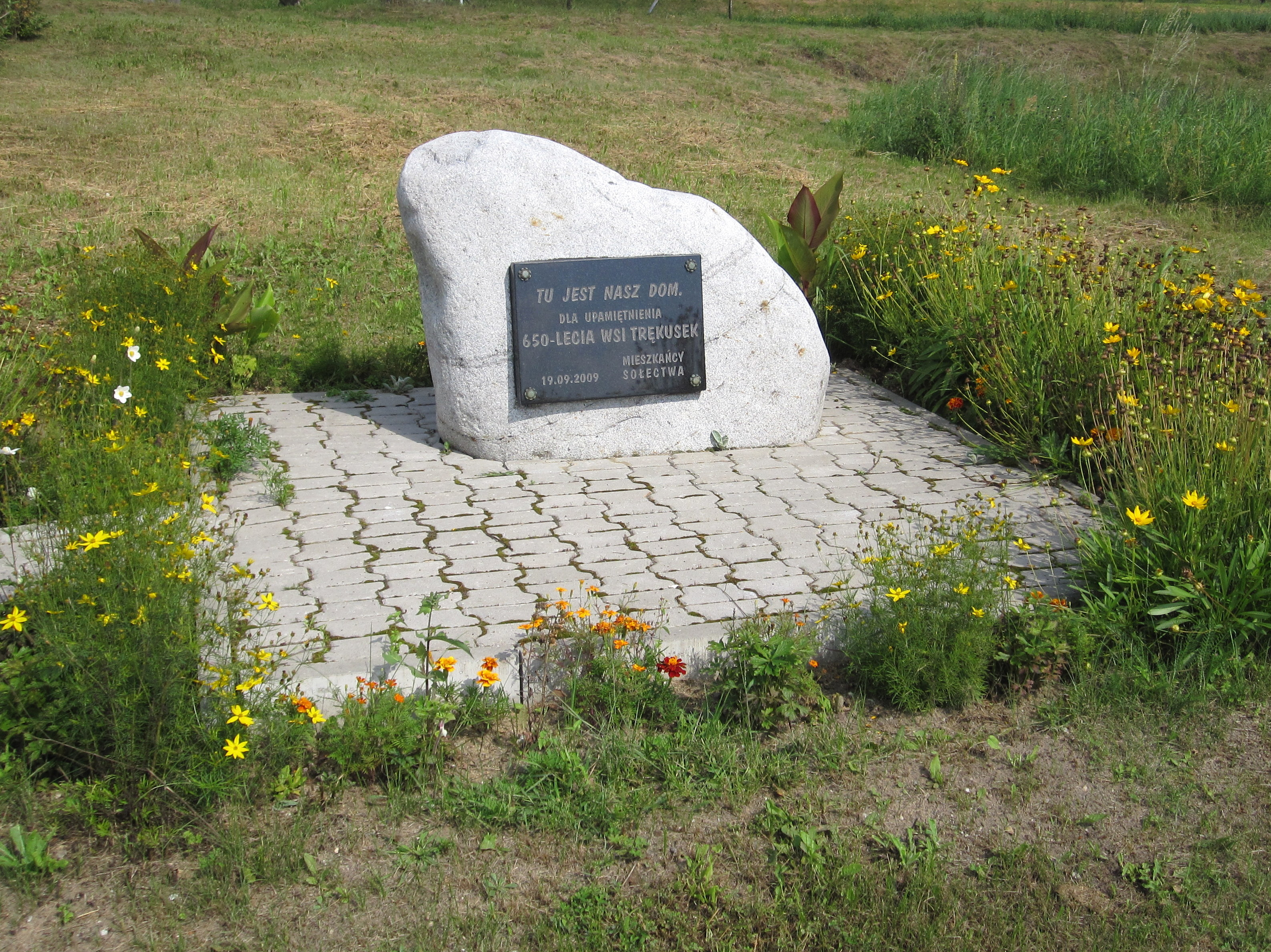
Memorial stone

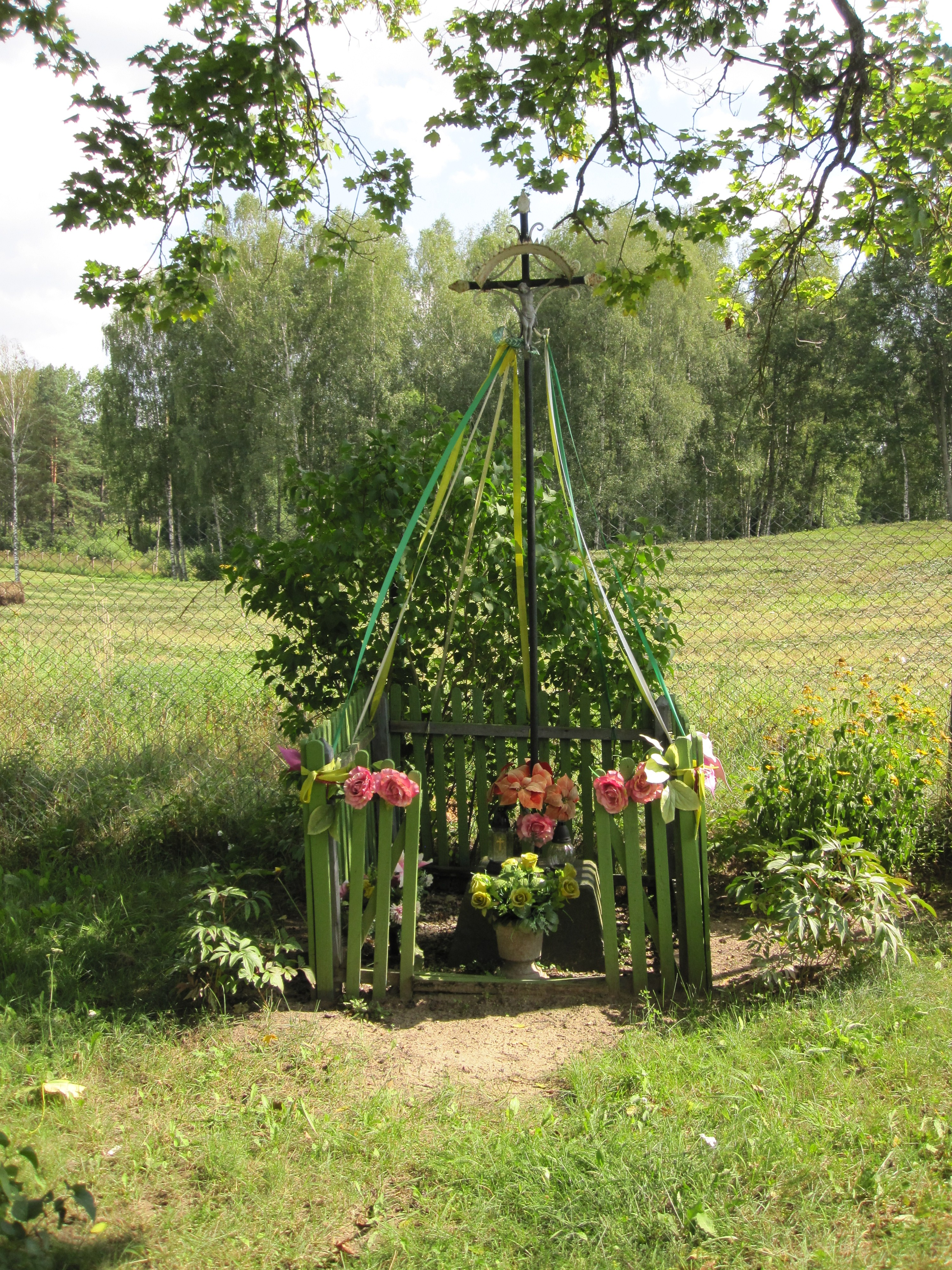
Road cross

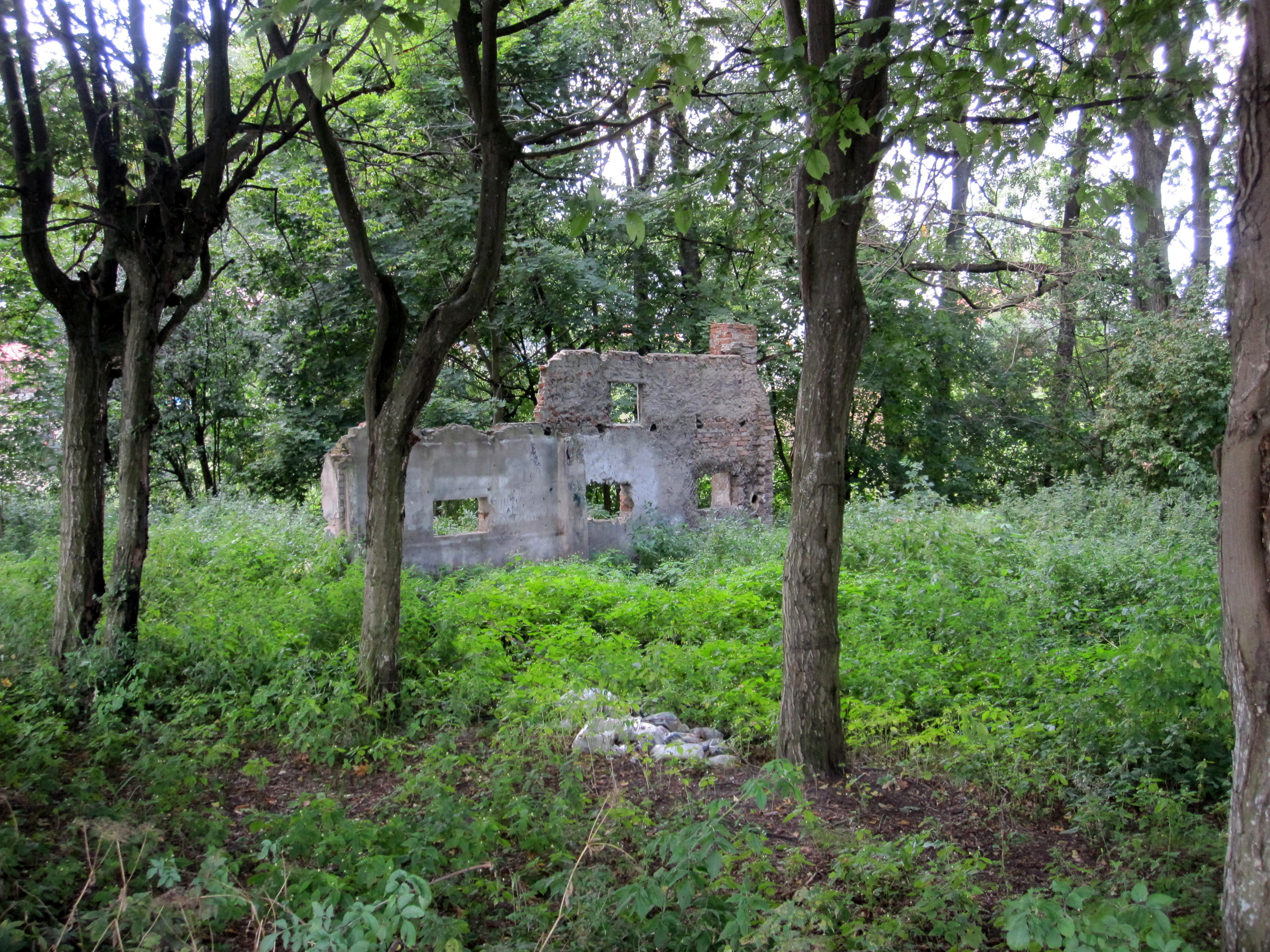
Manor ruins

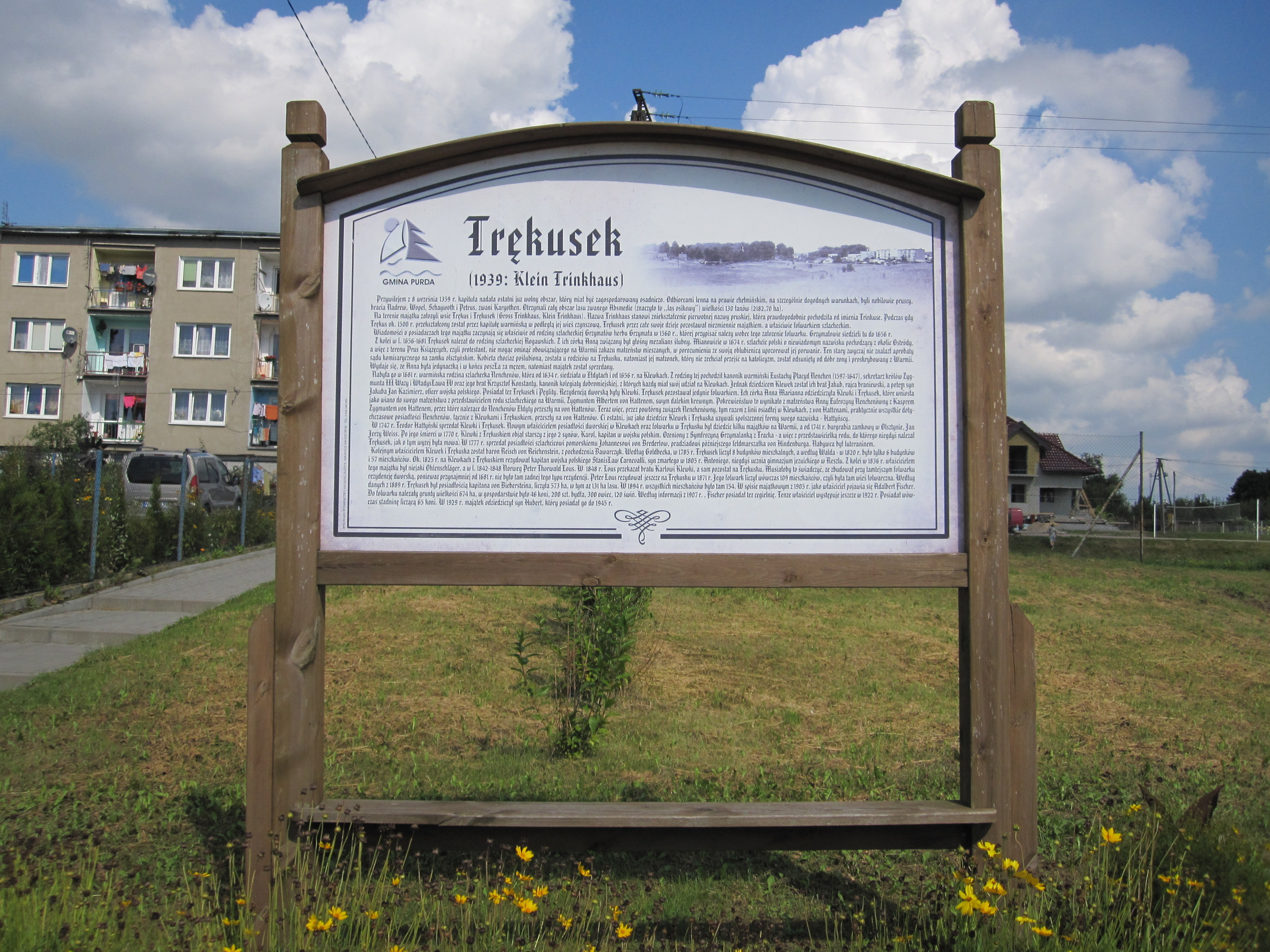
Information board in Trękusek
