= Nowa Wieś, Olsztyn County =

Nowa Wieś
- Village
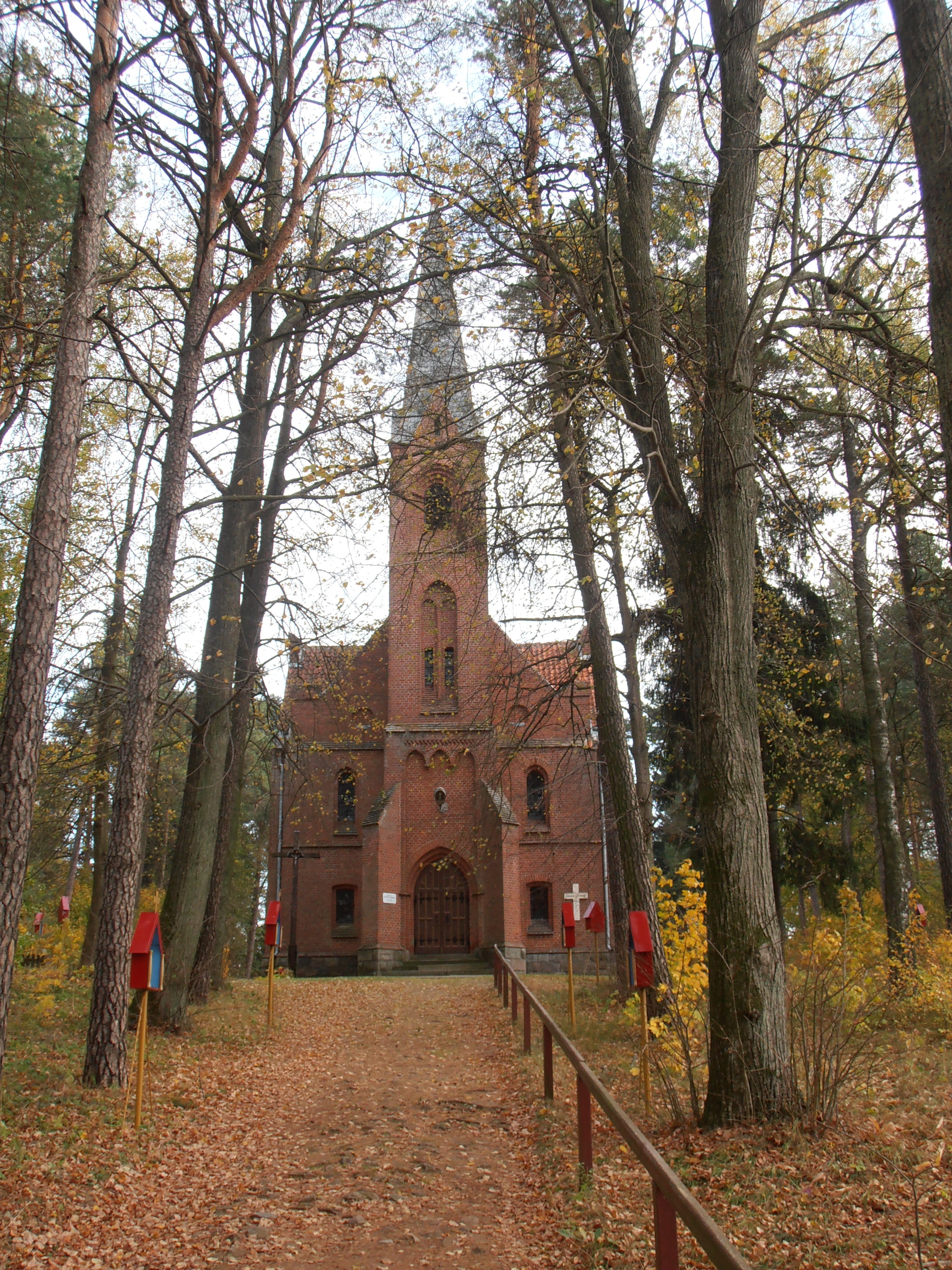
- Saint Joseph church in Nowa Wieś

- Location within Poland
- Coordinates: 53°39′N 20°36′E
- Country: Poland
- Voivodeship: Warmian-Masurian
- County: Olsztyn
- Gmina: Purda
- Population (2011): 462
- Time zone: UTC+1 (CET)
  - Summer (DST): UTC+2 (CEST)
- Postal code: 11-030
- Area code: +48 89
- Vehicle registration: NOL

Nowa Wieś [ˈnɔva ˈvjɛɕ] is a village in the administrative district of Gmina Purda, within Olsztyn County, Warmian-Masurian Voivodeship, in northern Poland. It is located within Warmia.

A historic church of Saint Joseph is located in Nowa Wieś.
