= Szczęsne, Warmian-Masurian Voivodeship =

Szczęsne
- Village
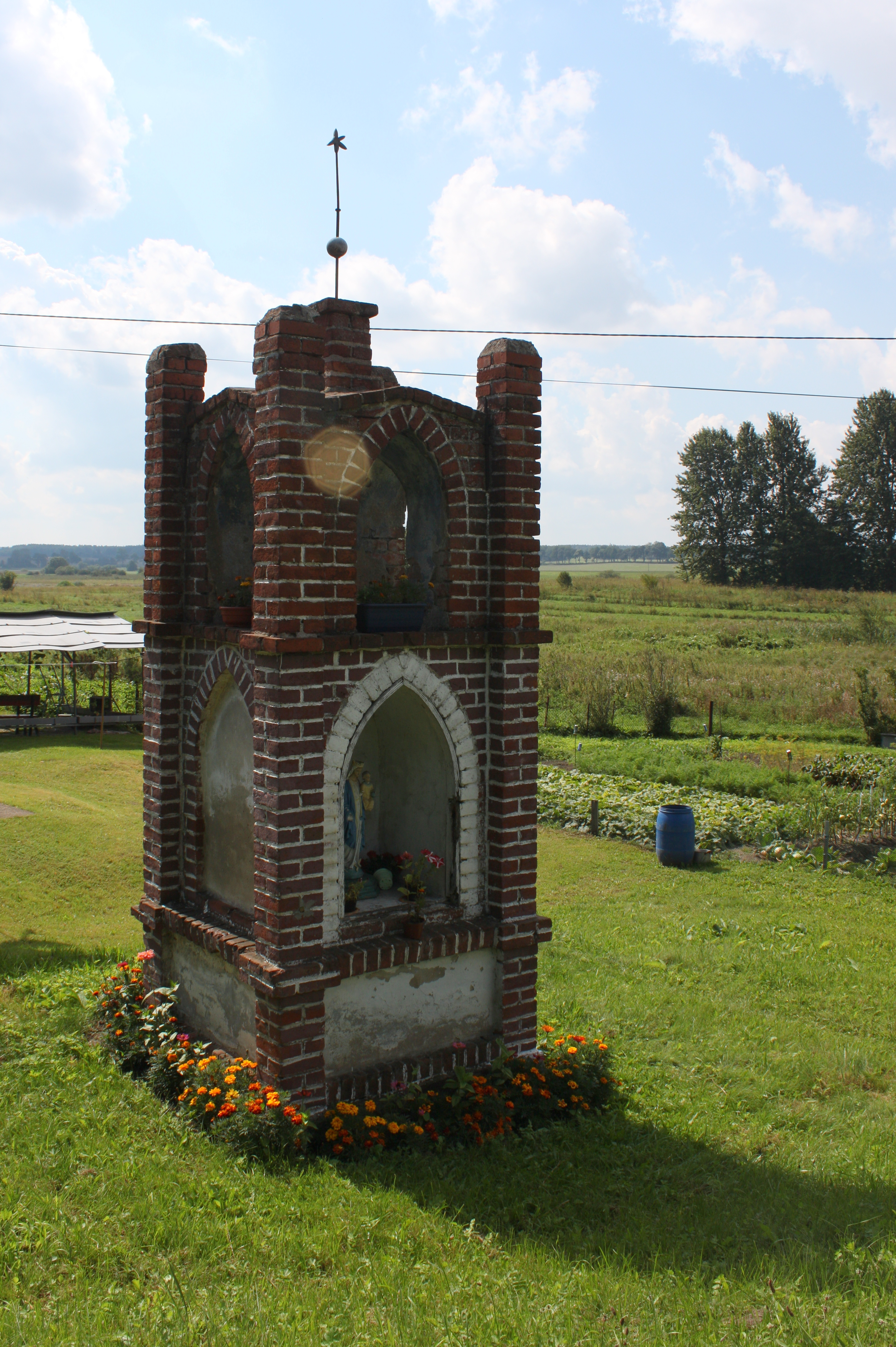
- Warmian old wayside shrine

- Location within Poland
- Coordinates: 53°44′N 20°34′E
- Country: Poland
- Voivodeship: Warmian-Masurian
- County: Olsztyn
- Gmina: Purda
- Time zone: UTC+1 (CET)
  - Summer (DST): UTC+2 (CEST)
- Area code: +48 89
- Vehicle registration: NOL

Szczęsne [ˈʂt͡ʂɛ̃snɛ] is a village in the administrative district of Gmina Purda, within Olsztyn County, Warmian-Masurian Voivodeship, in northern Poland. It is located within the historic region of Warmia.

Before 1772 the area was part of Kingdom of Poland, from 1772 of Prussia, after 1871 of Germany (East Prussia), and after 1945 of Poland.

Four historic wayside shrines, typical for Warmia, are located within the village.
