= Nowy Przykop =

- Village
- Location within Poland
- Coordinates: 53°38′23″N 20°34′54″E
- Country: Poland
- Voivodeship: Warmian-Masurian
- County: Olsztyn
- Gmina: Purda
- Elevation: 155 m (509 ft)
- Population: 50
- Time zone: UTC+1 (CET)
  - Summer (DST): UTC+2 (CEST)
- Postal code: 11-030
- Area code: +48 89
- Vehicle registration: NOL

Nowy Przykop [ˈnɔvɨ ˈpʂɨkɔp] is a village in the administrative district of Gmina Purda, within Olsztyn County, Warmian-Masurian Voivodeship, in northern Poland. It is located within historic Warmia.

Before 1772 the area was part of Kingdom of Poland, in 1772–1871 of Prussia, in 1871–1945 of Germany, and since 1945 of Poland.
