= Pajtuny, Olsztyn County =

Pajtuny
- Village
- Location within Poland
- Coordinates: 53°44′N 20°43′E
- Country: Poland
- Voivodeship: Warmian-Masurian
- County: Olsztyn
- Gmina: Purda
- Time zone: UTC+1 (CET)
  - Summer (DST): UTC+2 (CEST)
- Area code: +48 89
- Vehicle registration: NOL

Pajtuny [pai̯ˈtunɨ] is a village in the administrative district of Gmina Purda, within Olsztyn County, Warmian-Masurian Voivodeship, in northern Poland. It is located within the historic region of Warmia.

The village was founded in 1374. In the interwar period the nearby settlement of Pajtuński Młyn was separated from the village.

Before 1772 the area was part of Kingdom of Poland, from 1772 of Prussia, after 1871 of Germany, and after 1945 of Poland.

Two historic wayside shrines, typical for Warmia, are located within the village.
