= Stary Olsztyn =

- Village
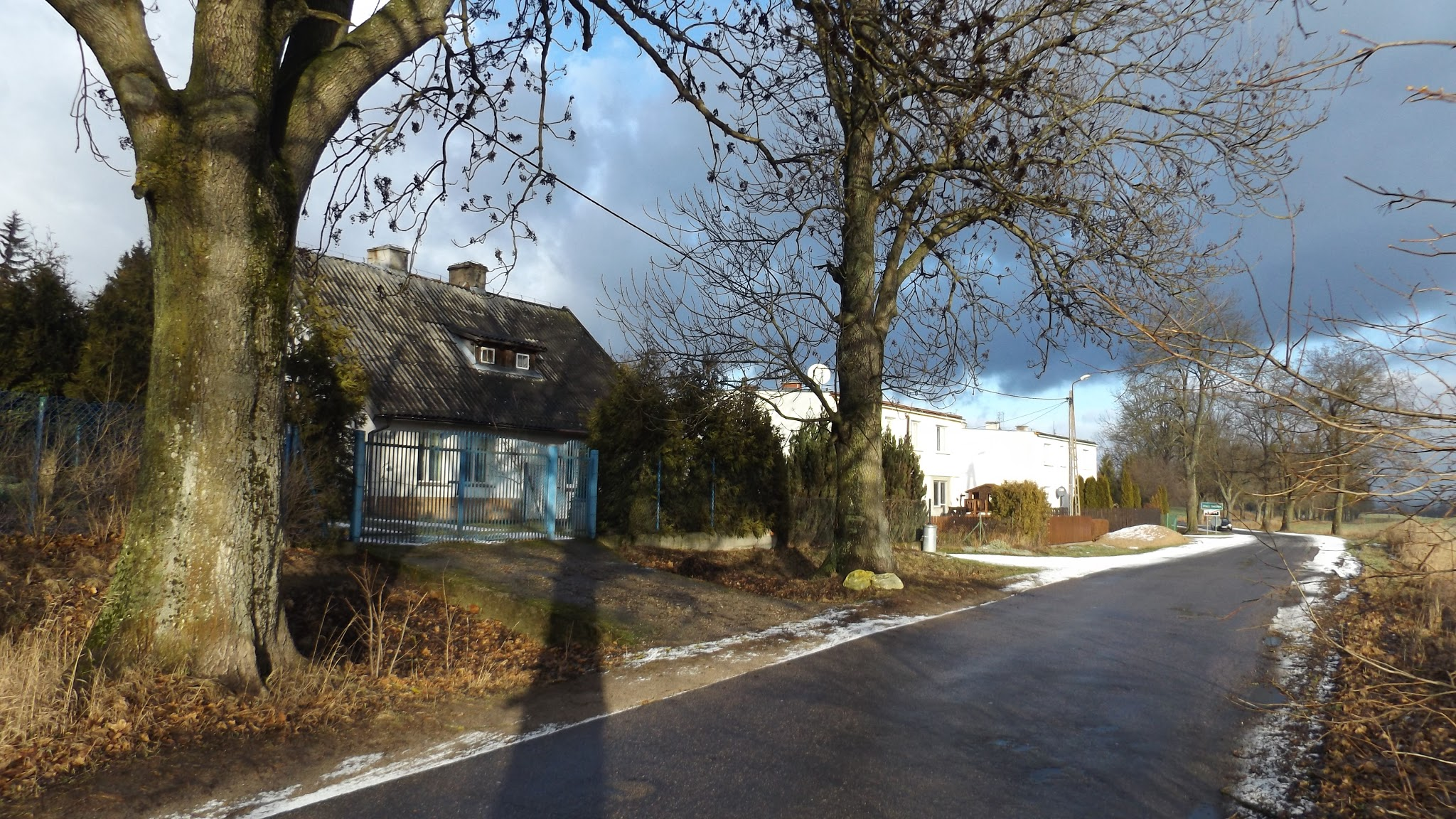

- Location within Poland
- Coordinates: 53°43′N 20°32′E
- Country: Poland
- Voivodeship: Warmian-Masurian
- County: Olsztyn
- Gmina: Purda
- Time zone: UTC+1 (CET)
  - Summer (DST): UTC+2 (CEST)
- Area code: +48 89
- Vehicle registration: NOL

Stary Olsztyn [ˈstarɨ ˈɔlʂtɨn] is a village in the administrative district of Gmina Purda, within Olsztyn County, Warmian-Masurian Voivodeship, in northern Poland. It is located within the historic region of Warmia.

A historic park is located in the village. Rock guitarist Marek Jackowski was born in Stary Olsztyn.
