= Kopanki, Warmian-Masurian Voivodeship =

Kopanki
- Village
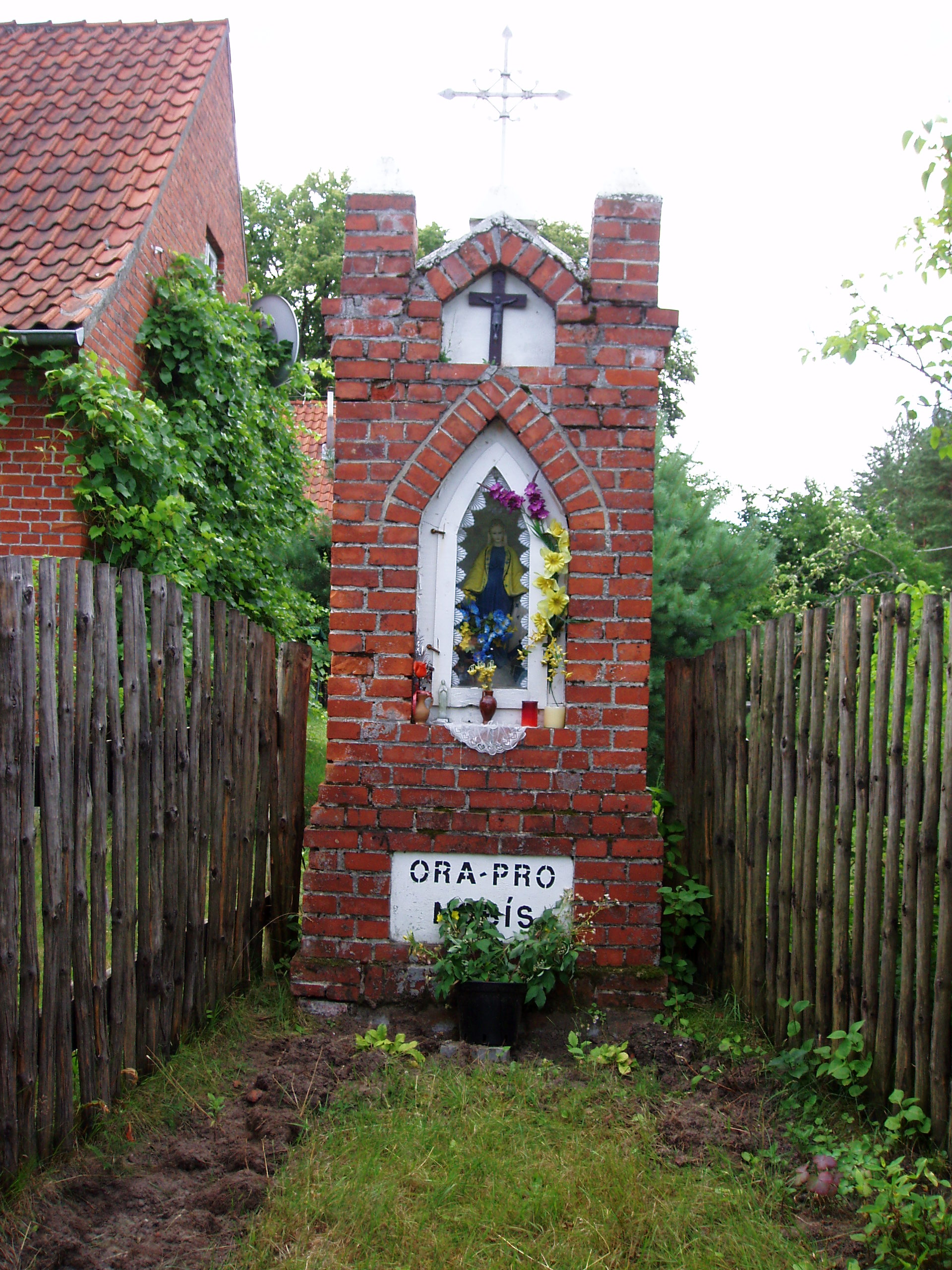
- Warmian old wayside shrine in Kopanki

- Location within Poland
- Coordinates: 53°37′45″N 20°37′49″E
- Country: Poland
- Voivodeship: Warmian-Masurian
- County: Olsztyn
- Gmina: Purda
- Population: 240
- Time zone: UTC+1 (CET)
  - Summer (DST): UTC+2 (CEST)
- Area code: +48 89
- Vehicle registration: NOL

Kopanki [kɔˈpanki] is a village in the administrative district of Gmina Purda, within Olsztyn County, Warmian-Masurian Voivodeship, in northern Poland. It is located in Warmia.

Before 1772 the area was part of Kingdom of Poland, in 1772–1871 of Prussia, in 1871–1945 of Germany, and since 1945 of Poland.
