= Pajtuński Młyn =

- Settlement
- Location within Poland
- Coordinates: 53°43′42″N 20°40′33″E
- Country: Poland
- Voivodeship: Warmian-Masurian
- County: Olsztyn
- Gmina: Purda
- Time zone: UTC+1 (CET)
  - Summer (DST): UTC+2 (CEST)
- Area code: +48 89
- Vehicle registration: NOL

Pajtuński Młyn [pai̯ˈtuɲski ˈmwɨn] is a settlement in the administrative district of Gmina Purda, within Olsztyn County, Warmian-Masurian Voivodeship, in northern Poland. It is located within the historic region of Warmia.

Until the interwar period it formed part of the nearby village of Pajtuny, founded in 1374. A historic water mill is located in Pajtuński Młyn.

Before 1772 the area was part of Kingdom of Poland, from 1772 of Prussia, after 1871 of Germany, and after 1945 of Poland.
