= Ostrzeszewo =

- Village
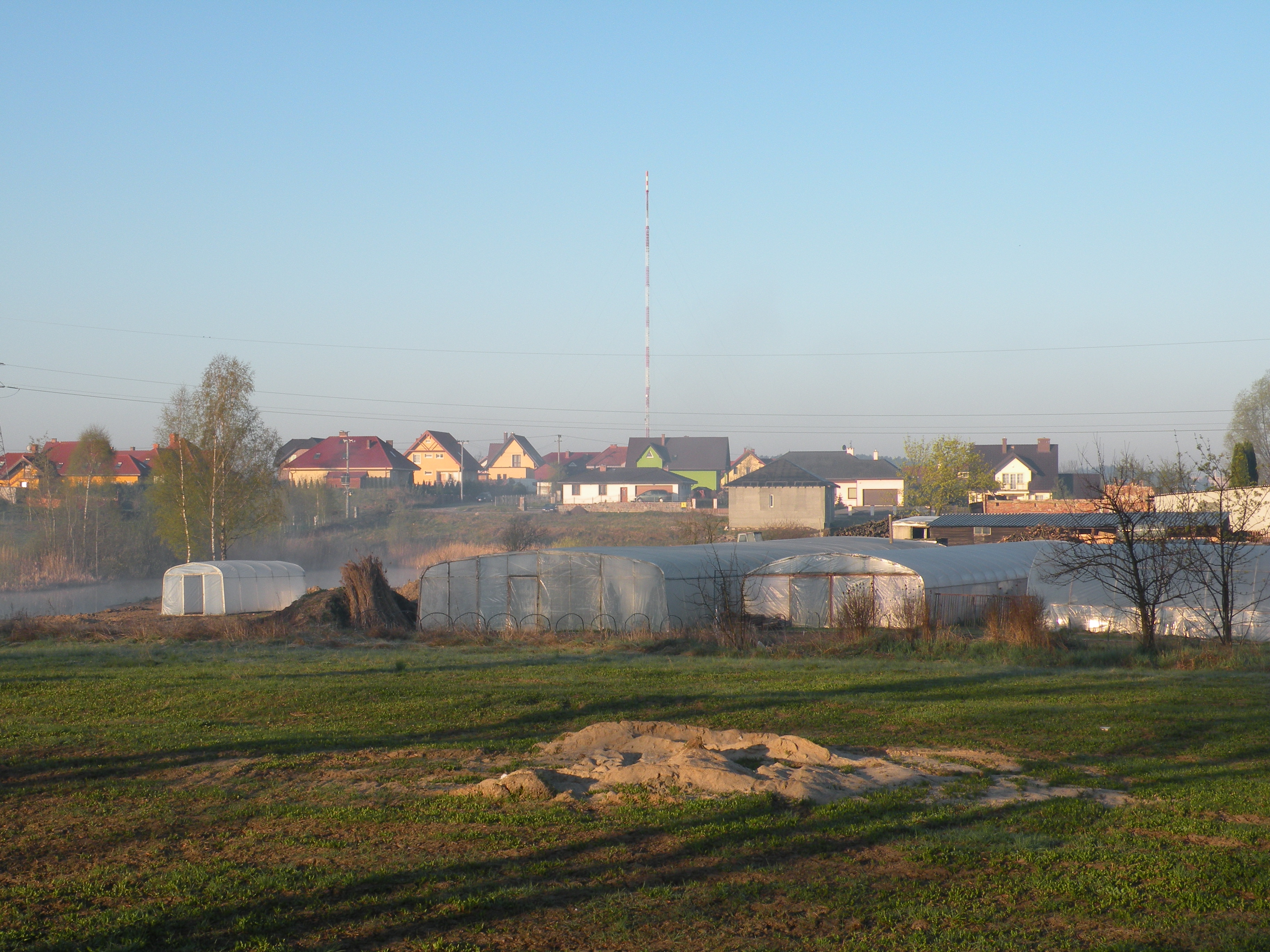

- Location within Poland
- Coordinates: 53°46′02″N 20°32′12″E
- Country: Poland
- Voivodeship: Warmian-Masurian
- County: Olsztyn
- Gmina: Purda
- Time zone: UTC+1 (CET)
  - Summer (DST): UTC+2 (CEST)
- Area code: +48 89
- Vehicle registration: NOL

Ostrzeszewo [ɔstʂɛˈʂɛvɔ] is a village in the administrative district of Gmina Purda, within Olsztyn County, Warmian-Masurian Voivodeship, in northern Poland. It is located within the historic region of Warmia.

Before 1772 the area was part of Kingdom of Poland, from 1772 of Prussia, after 1871 of Germany, and after 1945 of Poland.
