= Chaberkowo =

- Village
- Location within Poland
- Coordinates: 53°37′31″N 20°34′6″E
- Country: Poland
- Voivodeship: Warmian-Masurian
- County: Olsztyn
- Gmina: Purda
- Elevation: 156 m (512 ft)
- Population (2011): 56
- Time zone: UTC+1 (CET)
  - Summer (DST): UTC+2 (CEST)
- Postal code: 11-030
- Area code: +48 89
- Vehicle registration: NOL

Chaberkowo [xabɛrˈkɔvɔ] is a village in the administrative district of Gmina Purda, within Olsztyn County, Warmian-Masurian Voivodeship, in northern Poland. It is located within historic Warmia.
