= Zaborowo, Olsztyn County =

Zaborowo
- Settlement
- Location within Poland
- Coordinates: 53°42′N 20°46′E
- Country: Poland
- Voivodeship: Warmian-Masurian
- County: Olsztyn
- Gmina: Purda
- Time zone: UTC+1 (CET)
  - Summer (DST): UTC+2 (CEST)
- Area code: +48 89
- Vehicle registration: NOL

Zaborowo ([zabɔˈrɔvɔ]; German: Saborowen, 1938–45 Heideberg) is a settlement in the administrative district of Gmina Purda, within Olsztyn County, Warmian-Masurian Voivodeship, in northern Poland.

Before 1772 the area was part of Kingdom of Poland, in 1772–1871 of Prussia, in 1871–1945 of Germany, and since 1945 of Poland. During the Nazi campaign of changing placenames to remove traces of Polish origin, it was renamed to Heideberg. The historic name Zaborowo was restored in post-war Poland in 1945.
