= Łajs =

- Village
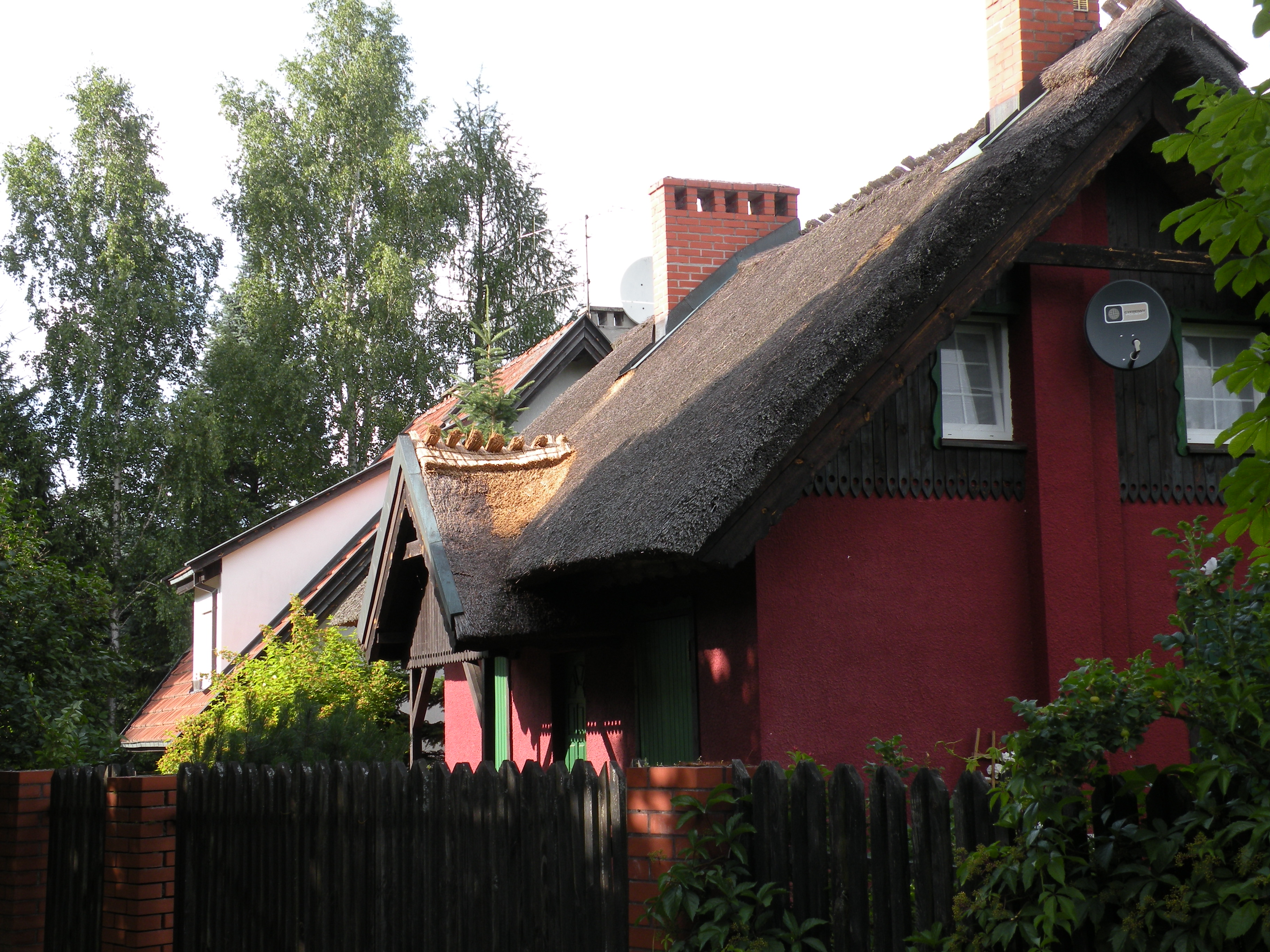

- Location within Poland
- Coordinates: 53°37′14″N 20°39′03″E
- Country: Poland
- Voivodeship: Warmian-Masurian
- County: Olsztyn
- Gmina: Purda
- Elevation: 148 m (486 ft)

Population (2011)
  - Total: 33
- Time zone: UTC+1 (CET)
  - Summer (DST): UTC+2 (CEST)
- Postal code: 11-030
- Area code: +48 89
- Vehicle registration: NOL

Łajs [wai̯s] is a village in the administrative district of Gmina Purda, within Olsztyn County, Warmian-Masurian Voivodeship, in northern Poland. It is located at the historic border between Warmia and Masuria.
