= Bałdzki Piec =

- Village
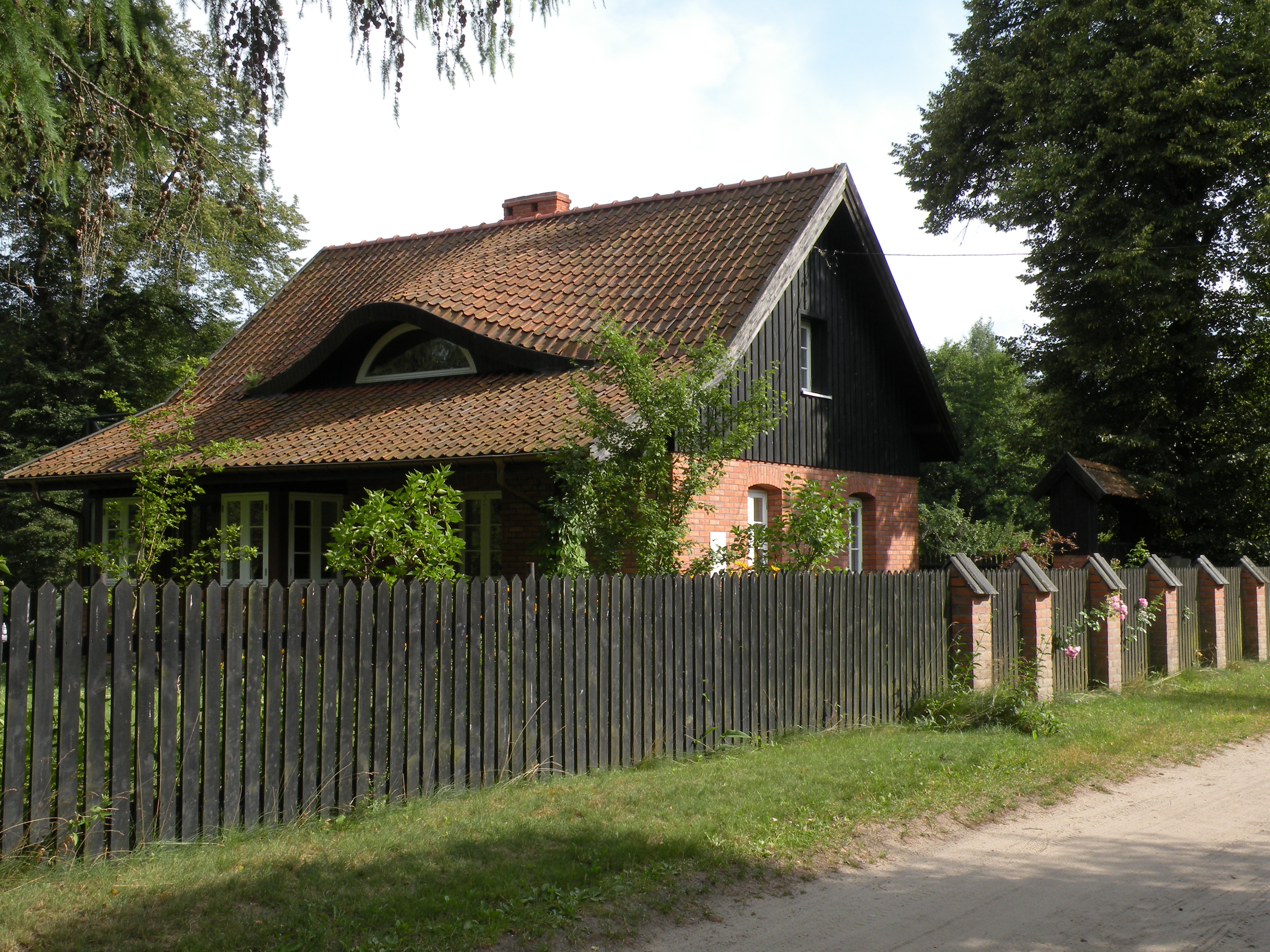

- Location within Poland
- Coordinates: 53°37′N 20°39′E
- Country: Poland
- Voivodeship: Warmian-Masurian
- County: Olsztyn
- Gmina: Purda
- Elevation: 146 m (479 ft)
- Population (2011): 46
- Time zone: UTC+1 (CET)
  - Summer (DST): UTC+2 (CEST)
- Area code: +48 89
- Vehicle registration: NOL

Bałdzki Piec [ˈbau̯t͡ski ˈpjɛt͡s] is a village in the administrative district of Gmina Purda, within Olsztyn County, Warmian-Masurian Voivodeship, in northern Poland.

Before 1772 the area was part of Kingdom of Poland, in 1772–1871 of Prussia, in 1871–1945 of Germany, and again of Poland since 1945.
