= Wygoda, Olsztyn County =

Wygoda
- Village
- Location within Poland
- Coordinates: 53°41′12″N 20°35′51″E
- Country: Poland
- Voivodeship: Warmian-Masurian
- County: Olsztyn
- Gmina: Purda
- Population (2011): 93
- Time zone: UTC+01:00 (CET)
  - Summer (DST): UTC+02:00 (CEST)
- Area code: +48 89
- Vehicle registration: NOL

Wygoda [vɨˈɡɔda] is a village in the administrative district of Gmina Purda, within Olsztyn County, Warmian-Masurian Voivodeship, in northern Poland. It is located in Warmia.
