= Giławy =

- Village
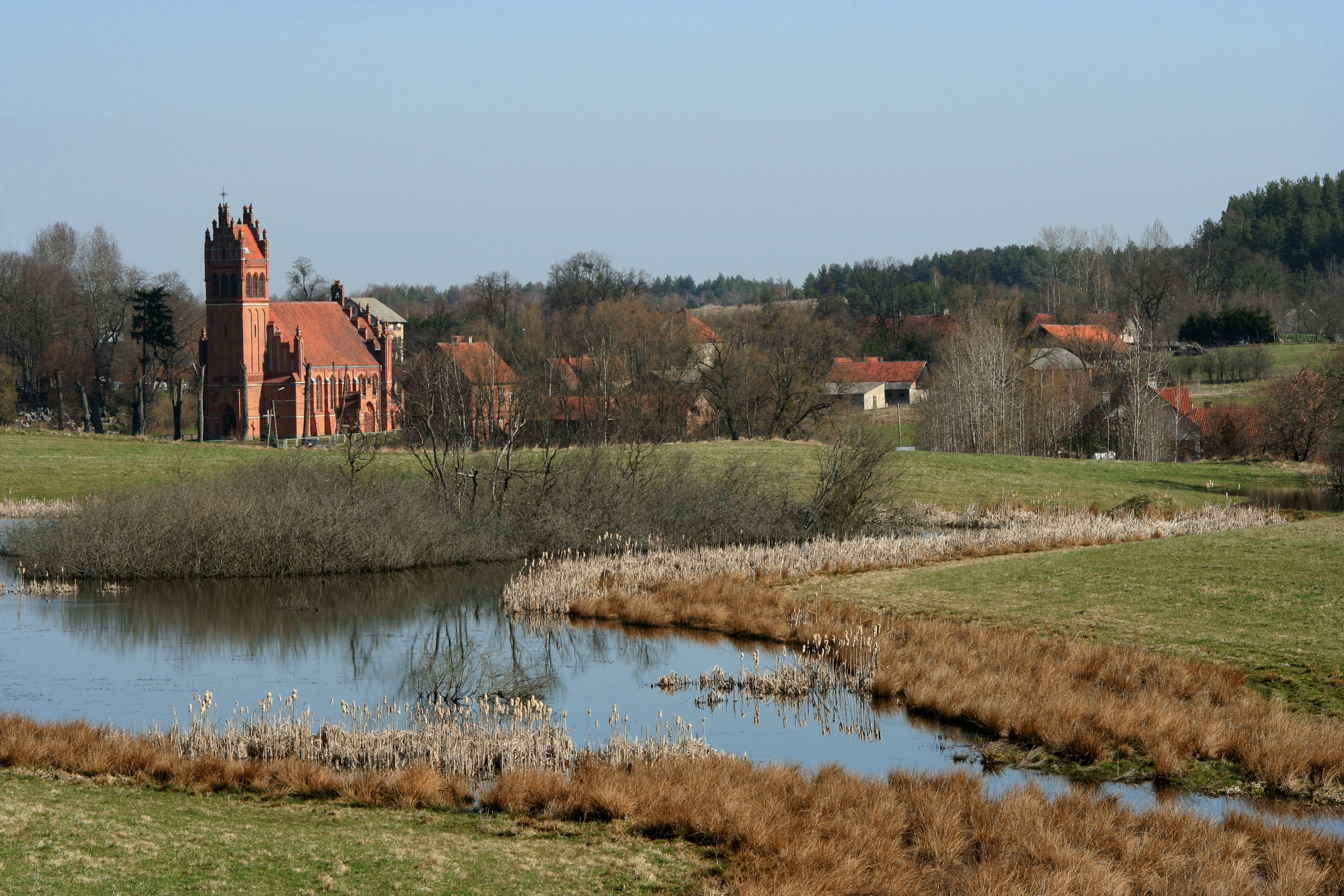

- Location within Poland
- Coordinates: 53°43′N 20°48′E
- Country: Poland
- Voivodeship: Warmian-Masurian
- County: Olsztyn
- Gmina: Purda
- Population (2011): 165
- Time zone: UTC+1 (CET)
  - Summer (DST): UTC+2 (CEST)
- Area code: +48 89
- Vehicle registration: NOL
- Website: www.gilawy.tnb.pl

Giławy [ɡiˈwavɨ] is a village in the administrative district of Gmina Purda, within Olsztyn County, Warmian-Masurian Voivodeship, in northern Poland. It is located in Warmia. The village has now a population of 540.

Before 1772 the area was part of Kingdom of Poland, in 1772–1871 of Prussia, in 1871–1945 of Germany, and of Poland since 1945. Despite being under German rule, a Polish school existed in the village before World War II. Its head in 1932-1933 was Edward Turowski, who during World War II was imprisoned by the Germans in the Sachsenhausen concentration camp, and later became a member of the Polish Sejm.

The historic church of St. John the Baptist and a historical Warmian wayside shrine are located in Giławy.
