= Groszkowo, Warmian-Masurian Voivodeship =

Groszkowo
- Village
- Location within Poland
- Coordinates: 53°42′49″N 20°47′3″E
- Country: Poland
- Voivodeship: Warmian-Masurian
- County: Olsztyn
- Gmina: Purda
- Population (2011): 43
- Time zone: UTC+1 (CET)
  - Summer (DST): UTC+2 (CEST)
- Area code: +48 89
- Vehicle registration: NOL

Groszkowo [ɡrɔʂˈkɔvɔ] is a village in the administrative district of Gmina Purda, within Olsztyn County, Warmian-Masurian Voivodeship, in northern Poland. It is located in Warmia.

A historical wayside shrine from the 18th century is located in Groszkowo.
