= Pokrzywy, Warmian-Masurian Voivodeship =

Pokrzywy
- Village
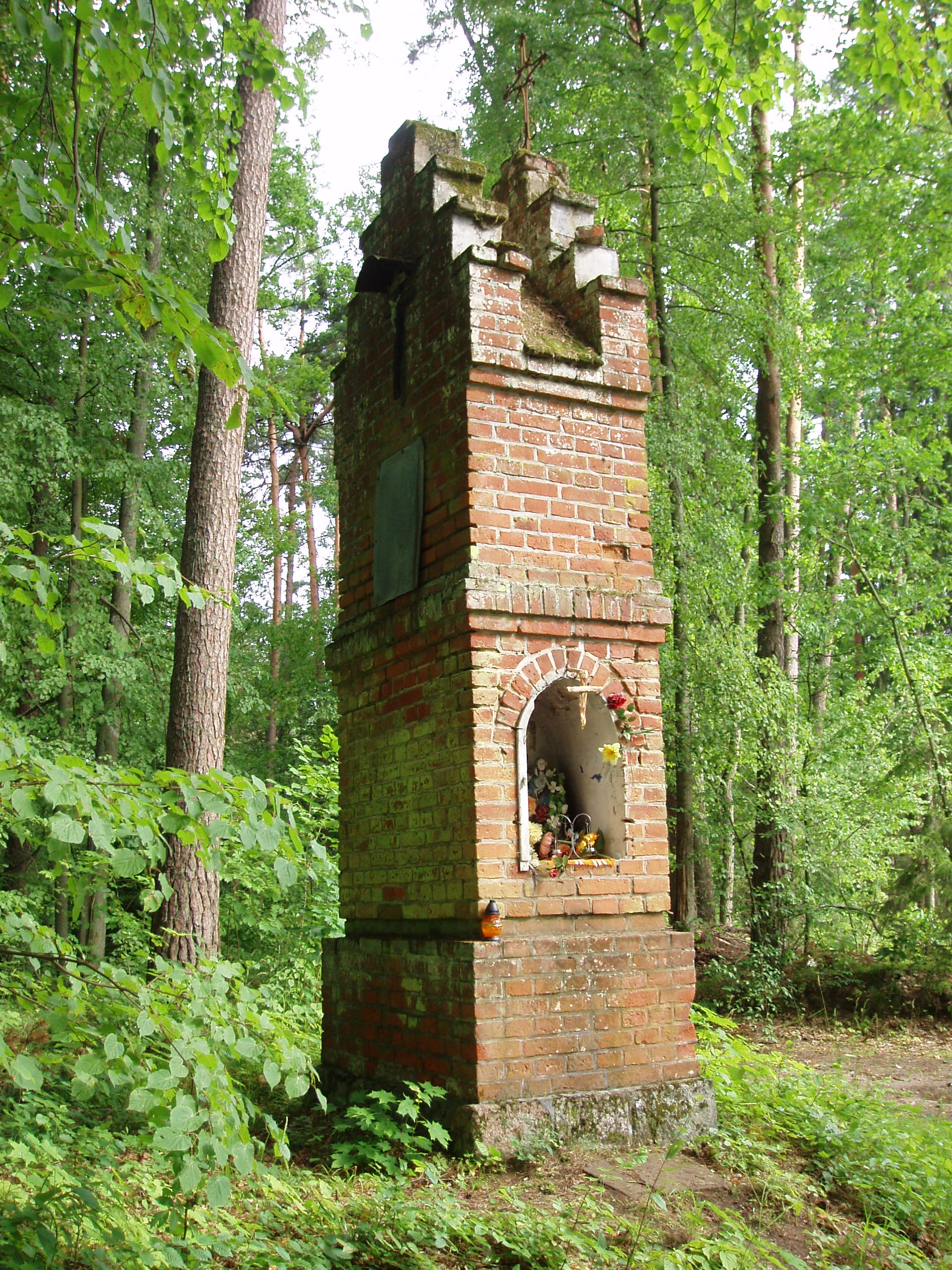
- Warmian old wayside shrine in Pokrzywy

- Location within Poland
- Coordinates: 53°37′44″N 20°33′57″E
- Country: Poland
- Voivodeship: Warmian-Masurian
- County: Olsztyn
- Gmina: Purda
- Elevation: 150 m (490 ft)
- Population: 130
- Time zone: UTC+1 (CET)
  - Summer (DST): UTC+2 (CEST)
- Area code: +48 89
- Vehicle registration: NOL

Pokrzywy [pɔˈkʂɨvɨ] is a village in the administrative district of Gmina Purda, within Olsztyn County, Warmian-Masurian Voivodeship, in northern Poland. It is located within the historic region of Warmia.

An 18th-century wayside shrine, typical for Warmia, is located in the village.
