= Kaborno =

- Village
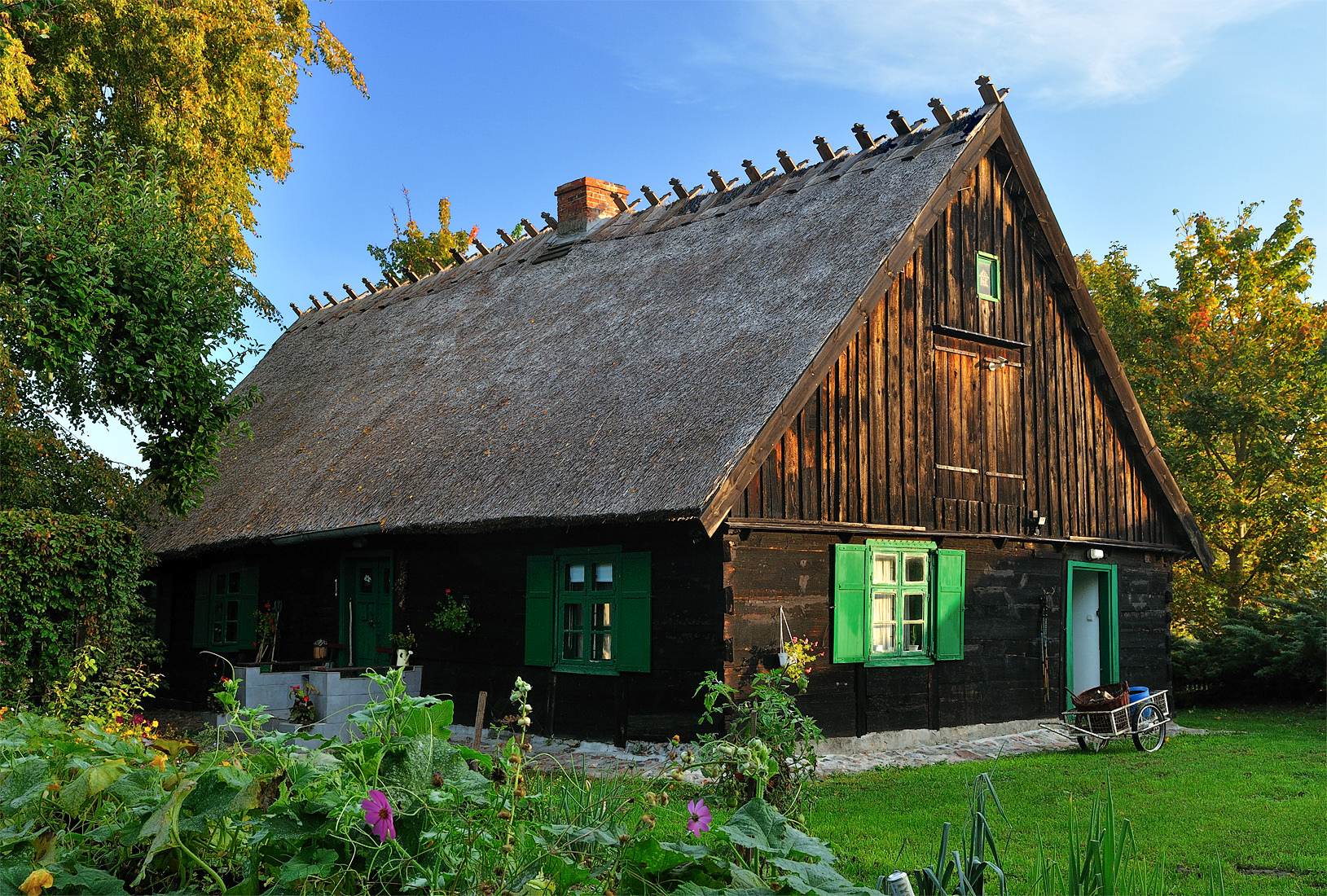
- An old style house in Kaborno

- Location within Poland
- Coordinates: 53°43′N 20°37′E
- Country: Poland
- Voivodeship: Warmian-Masurian
- County: Olsztyn
- Gmina: Purda
- Population (2011): 140
- Time zone: UTC+1 (CET)
  - Summer (DST): UTC+2 (CEST)
- Area code: +48 89
- Vehicle registration: NOL

Kaborno [kaˈbɔrnɔ] is a village in the administrative district of Gmina Purda, within Olsztyn County, Warmian-Masurian Voivodeship, in northern Poland. It is located in Warmia.

Several historic houses and two Warmian old wayside shrines are located in Kaborno.
