= Marek Jackowski =

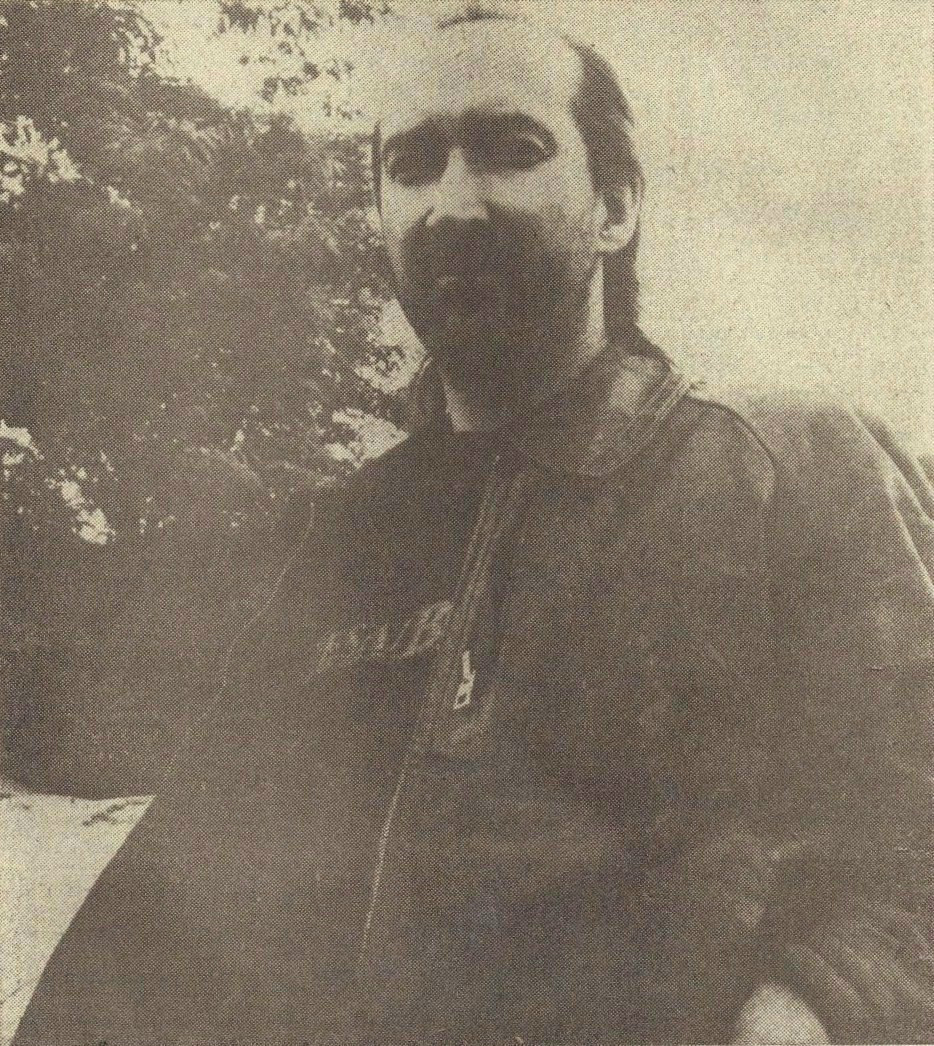

Background information
- Born: 11 December 1946 Stary Olsztyn, Poland
- Died: 18 May 2013 (aged 66) San Marco, Castellabate, Italy
- Genres: Rock
- Occupation(s): Musician, songwriter
- Instrument: Guitar

Marek Norbert Jackowski (11 December 1946 – 18 May 2013) was a Polish rock musician, best known as a member of the rock band Maanam.

== Discography ==
Solo albums

Year	Title	Peak chart positions	Certifications (sales thresholds)
Year	Title	POL	Certifications (sales thresholds)
1994	No1: Date: 1994; Label: Kamiling Co./Pomaton EMI	–	
1995	Fale Dunaju: Date: 1995; Label: Pomaton EMI	–	
2002	Złota kolekcja. Oprócz błękitnego nieba: Date: 19 October 2002; Label: Pomaton EMI	–	
2013	Marek Jackowski: Date: 23 October 2013; Label: Digital Works/Universal Music Poland	8	POL: Gold
"—" denotes a recording that did not chart.
