= Nowy Ramuk =

- Settlement
- Location within Poland
- Coordinates: 53°39′25″N 20°34′51″E
- Country: Poland
- Voivodeship: Warmian-Masurian
- County: Olsztyn
- Gmina: Purda
- Time zone: UTC+1 (CET)
  - Summer (DST): UTC+2 (CEST)
- Area code: +48 89
- Vehicle registration: NOL

Nowy Ramuk [ˈnɔvɨ ˈramuk] is a settlement in the administrative district of Gmina Purda, within Olsztyn County, Warmian-Masurian Voivodeship, in northern Poland. It is located within Warmia.
