= Marcinkowo, Olsztyn County =

Marcinkowo
- Village
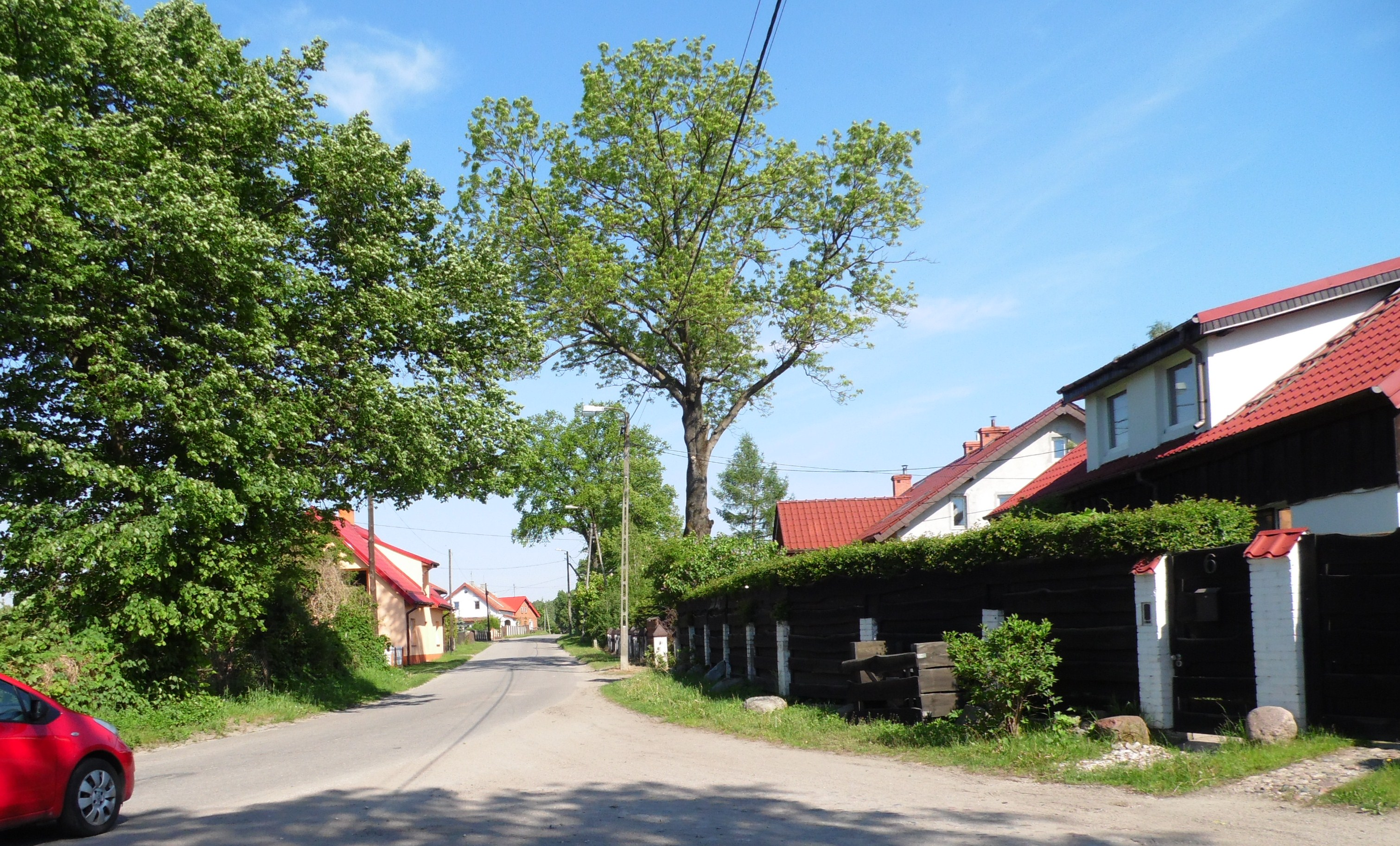

- Location within Poland
- Coordinates: 53°41′50″N 20°40′33″E
- Country: Poland
- Voivodeship: Warmian-Masurian
- County: Olsztyn
- Gmina: Purda
- Population (2011): 531
- Time zone: UTC+1 (CET)
  - Summer (DST): UTC+2 (CEST)
- Postal code: 11-030
- Area code: +48 89
- Vehicle registration: NOL

Marcinkowo [mart͡ɕinˈkɔvɔ] is a village in the administrative district of Gmina Purda, within Olsztyn County, Warmian-Masurian Voivodeship, in northern Poland. It is located within historic Warmia.

There are two historic Warmian wayside shrines in Marcinkowo, and a train station and a school.
