= Nerwik =

- Village
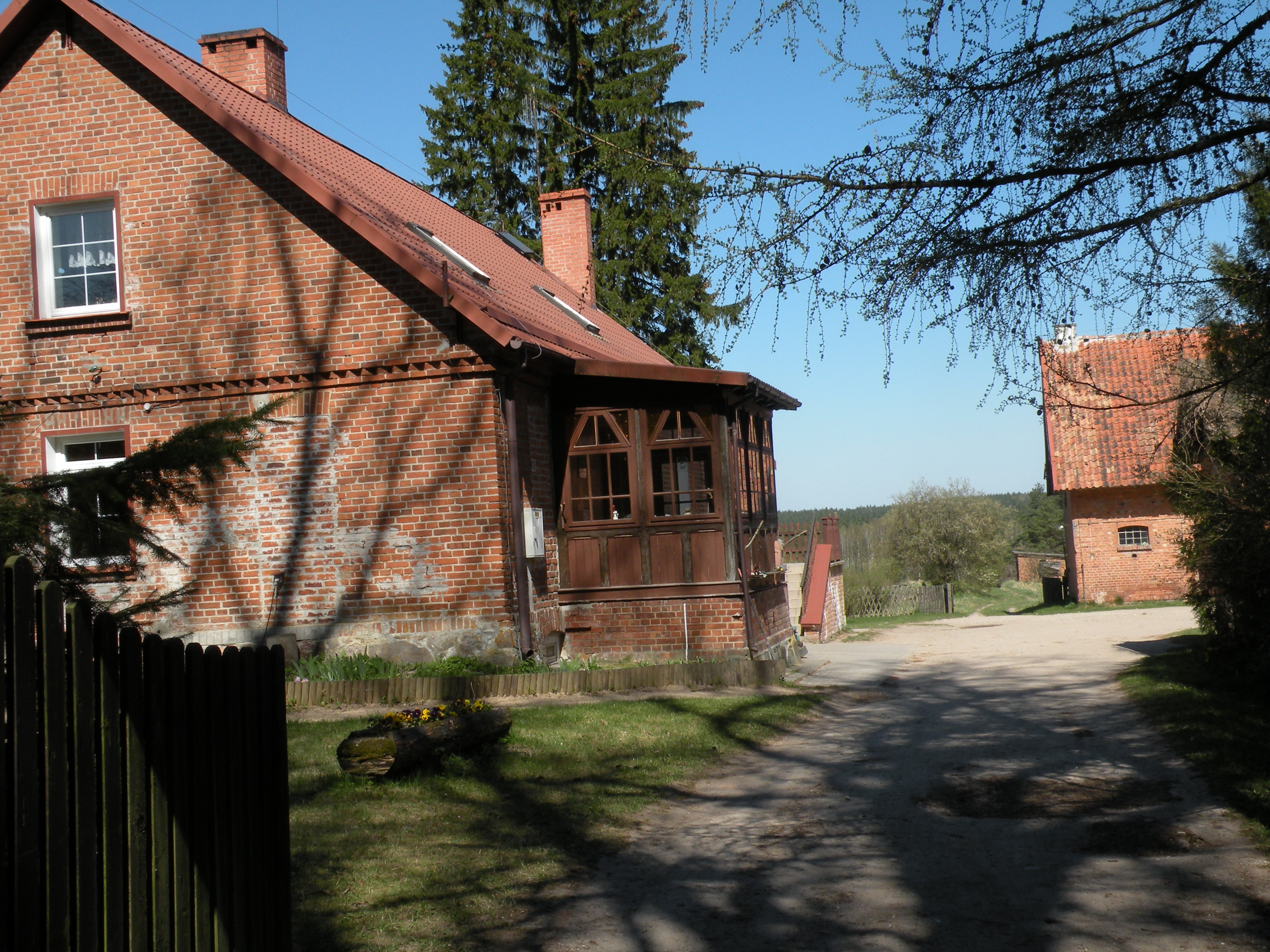

- Location within Poland
- Coordinates: 53°45′N 20°49′E
- Country: Poland
- Voivodeship: Warmian-Masurian
- County: Olsztyn
- Gmina: Purda
- Population (2011): 56
- Time zone: UTC+1 (CET)
  - Summer (DST): UTC+2 (CEST)
- Postal code: 11-030
- Area code: +48 89
- Vehicle registration: NOL

Nerwik [ˈnɛrvik] is a village in the administrative district of Gmina Purda, within Olsztyn County, Warmian-Masurian Voivodeship, in northern Poland. It is located within Warmia.

Nerwik is the birthplace of Polish jurist, publicist and activist Brunon Openkowski (1887–1952).
