= Gmina Purda =

Gmina Purda Purda Commune
- Gmina
- Interactive map of Gmina Purda
- Coordinates (Purda): 53°43′N 20°42′E
- Country: Poland
- Voivodeship: Warmian-Masurian
- County: Olsztyn County
- Seat: Purda

Area
  - Total: 318.19 km^{2} (122.85 sq mi)

Population (2006)
  - Total: 7,268
  - Density: 22.84/km^{2} (59.16/sq mi)
- Website: http://www.purda.pl/

Gmina Purda is a rural gmina (administrative district) in Olsztyn County, Warmian-Masurian Voivodeship, in northern Poland. Its seat is the village of Purda, which lies approximately 16 kilometres (10 mi) south-east of the regional capital Olsztyn.

The gmina covers an area of 318.19 square kilometres (122.9 sq mi), and as of 2006 its total population is 7,268.

== Villages ==
Gmina Purda contains the villages and settlements of Bałdy, Bałdzki Piec, Biedówko, Bruchwałd, Butryny, Chaberkowo, Gąsiorowo, Giławy, Groszkowo, Kaborno, Klebark Mały, Klebark Wielki, Klewki, Kołpaki, Kopanki, Łajs, Linowo, Marcinkowo, Nerwik, Nowa Kaletka, Nowa Wieś, Nowy Przykop, Nowy Ramuk, Ostrzeszewo, Pajtuński Młyn, Pajtuny, Patryki, Pokrzywy, Prejłowo, Przykop, Purda, Purda Leśna, Purdka, Silice, Stara Kaletka, Stary Olsztyn, Szczęsne, Trękus, Trękusek, Wojtkowizna, Wygoda, Wyrandy, Zaborowo and Zgniłocha.

== Neighbouring gminas ==
Gmina Purda is bordered by the city of Olsztyn and by the gminas of Barczewo, Dźwierzuty, Jedwabno, Olsztynek, Pasym and Stawiguda.
