= Bartążek =

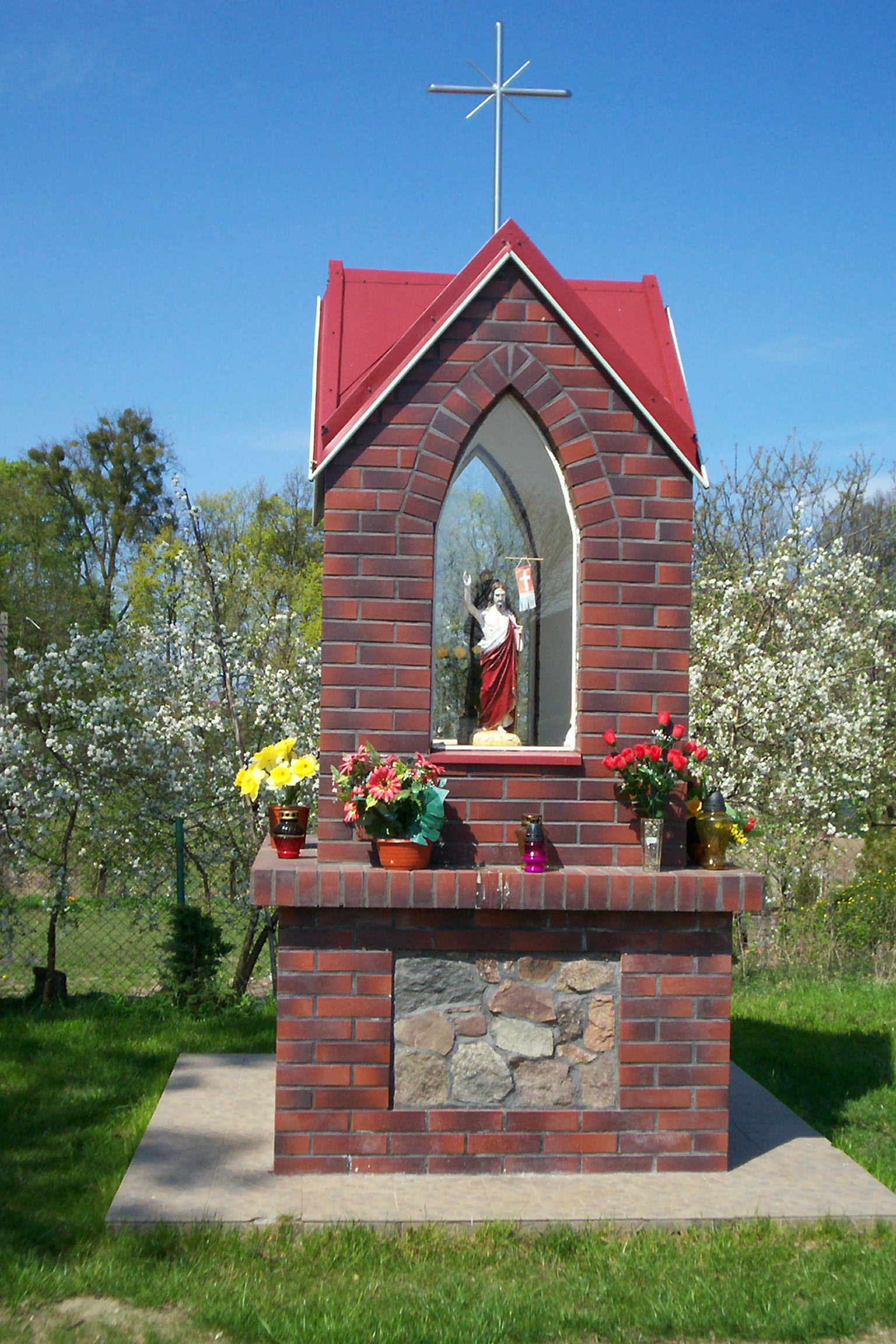
- Warmian wayside shrine in Bartążek

- Location within Poland
- Coordinates: 53°43′N 20°30′E
- Country: Poland
- Voivodeship: Warmian-Masurian
- County: Olsztyn
- Gmina: Stawiguda
- Time zone: UTC+1 (CET)
  - Summer (DST): UTC+2 (CEST)
- Area code: +48 89
- Vehicle registration: NOL

Bartążek [barˈtɔ̃ʐɛk] is a village in the administrative district of Gmina Stawiguda, within Olsztyn County, Warmian-Masurian Voivodeship, in northern Poland. It is located in Warmia.

In Bartążek there is a historic park, dating back to the 18th century.

Before 1772 the area was part of Kingdom of Poland, in 1772–1871 of Prussia, in 1871–1945 of Germany, and again of Poland since 1945.
