= Bartąg =

- Village
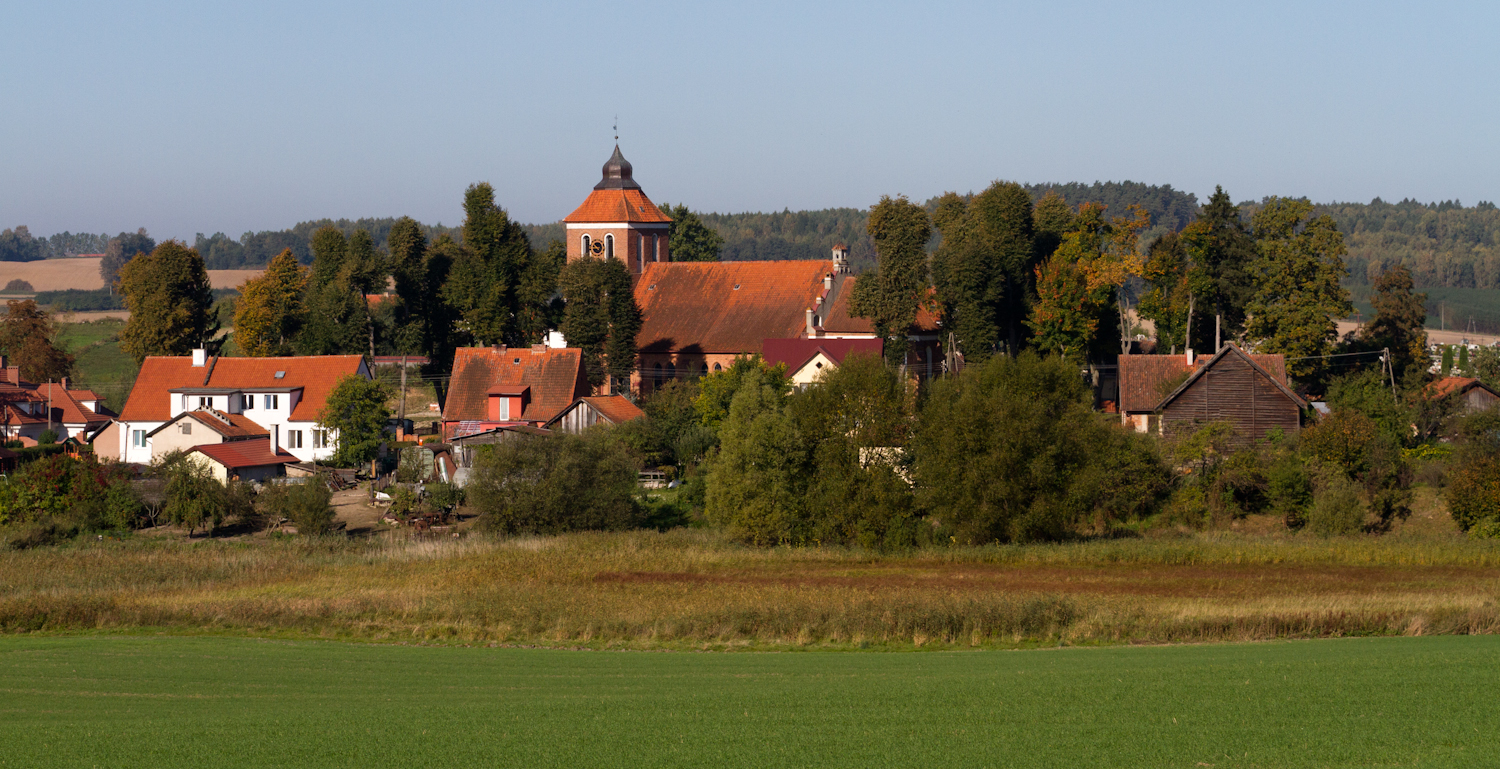

- Location within Poland
- Coordinates: 53°43′N 20°28′E
- Country: Poland
- Voivodeship: Warmian-Masurian
- County: Olsztyn
- Gmina: Stawiguda
- Population (2011): 858
- Time zone: UTC+1 (CET)
  - Summer (DST): UTC+2 (CEST)
- Area code: +48 89
- Vehicle registration: NOL

Bartąg [ˈbartɔnk] is a village in the administrative district of Gmina Stawiguda, within Olsztyn County, Warmian-Masurian Voivodeship, in northern Poland. It is located in Warmia.

Historic architecture of Bartąg includes the Saint John the Evangelist church, the rectory, several Warmian wayside shrines and two Catholic cemeteries dating back to the 19th-century.

== Gallery ==
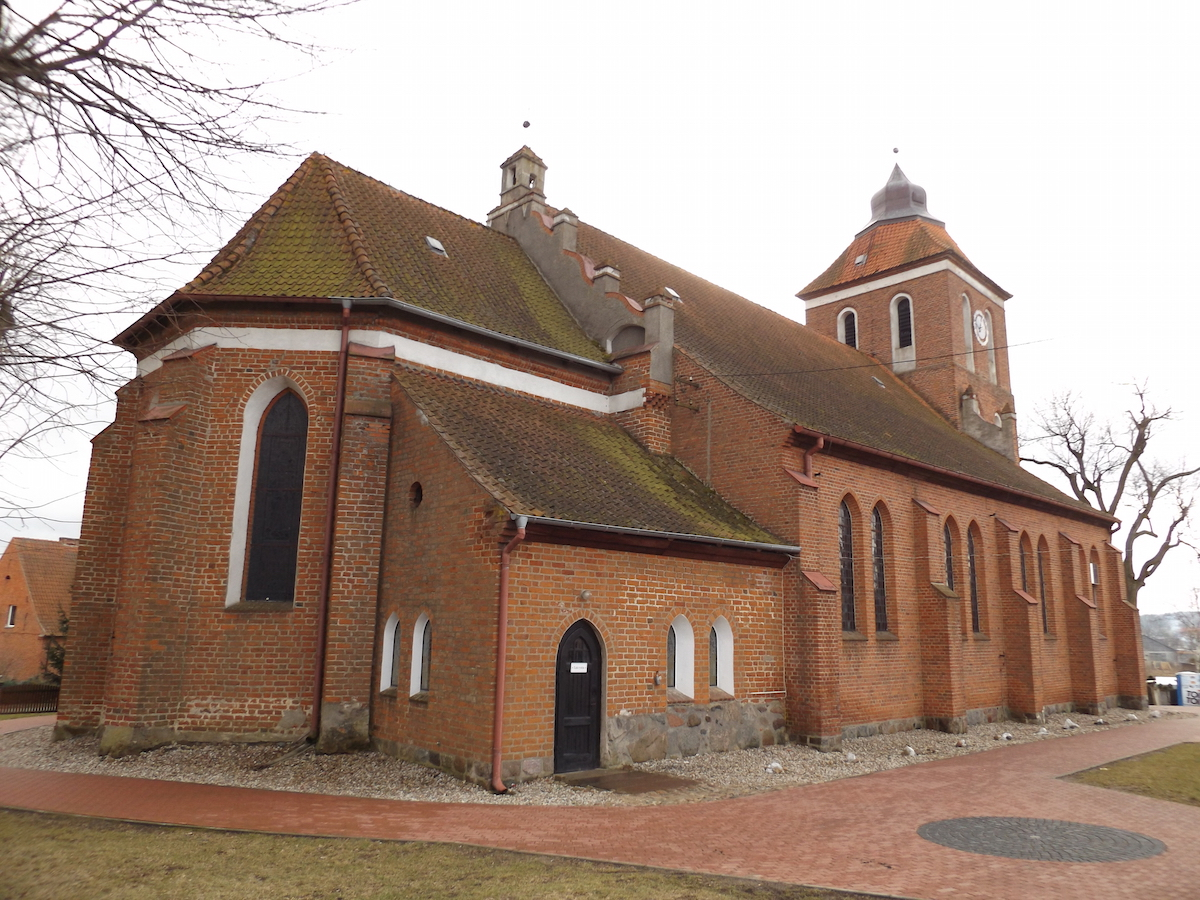
Saint John the Evangelist church

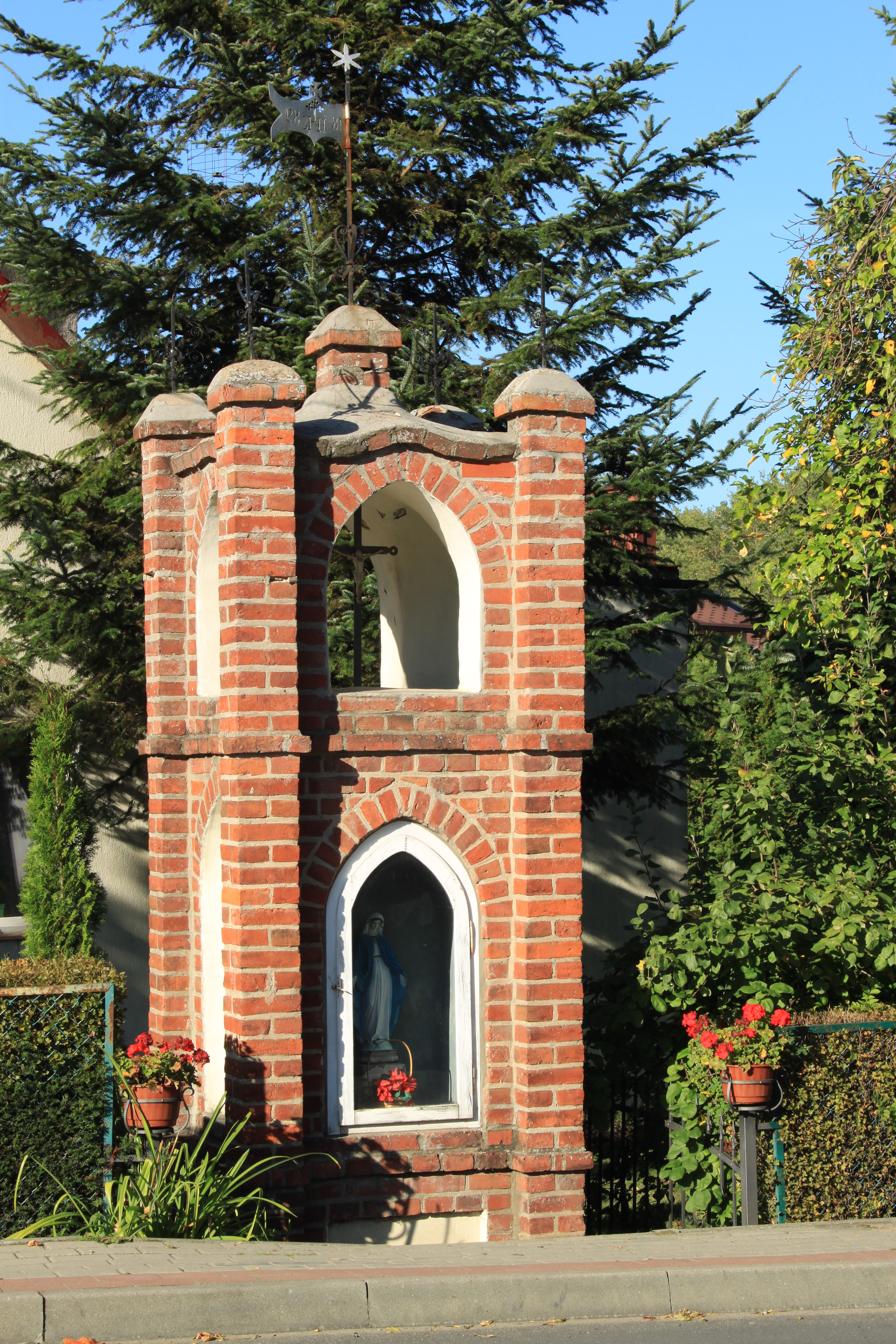
Warmian old wayside shrine

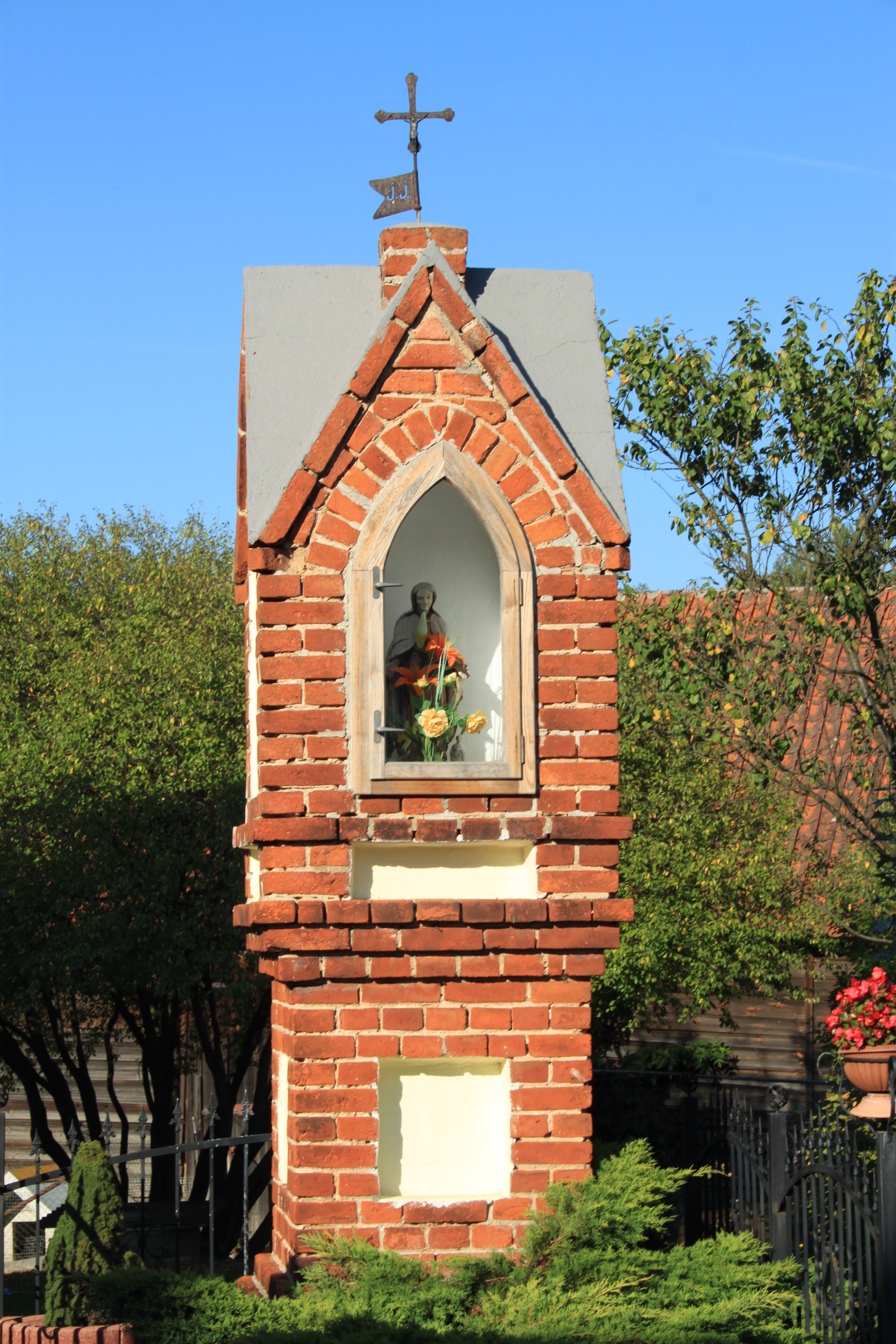
Warmian old wayside shrine

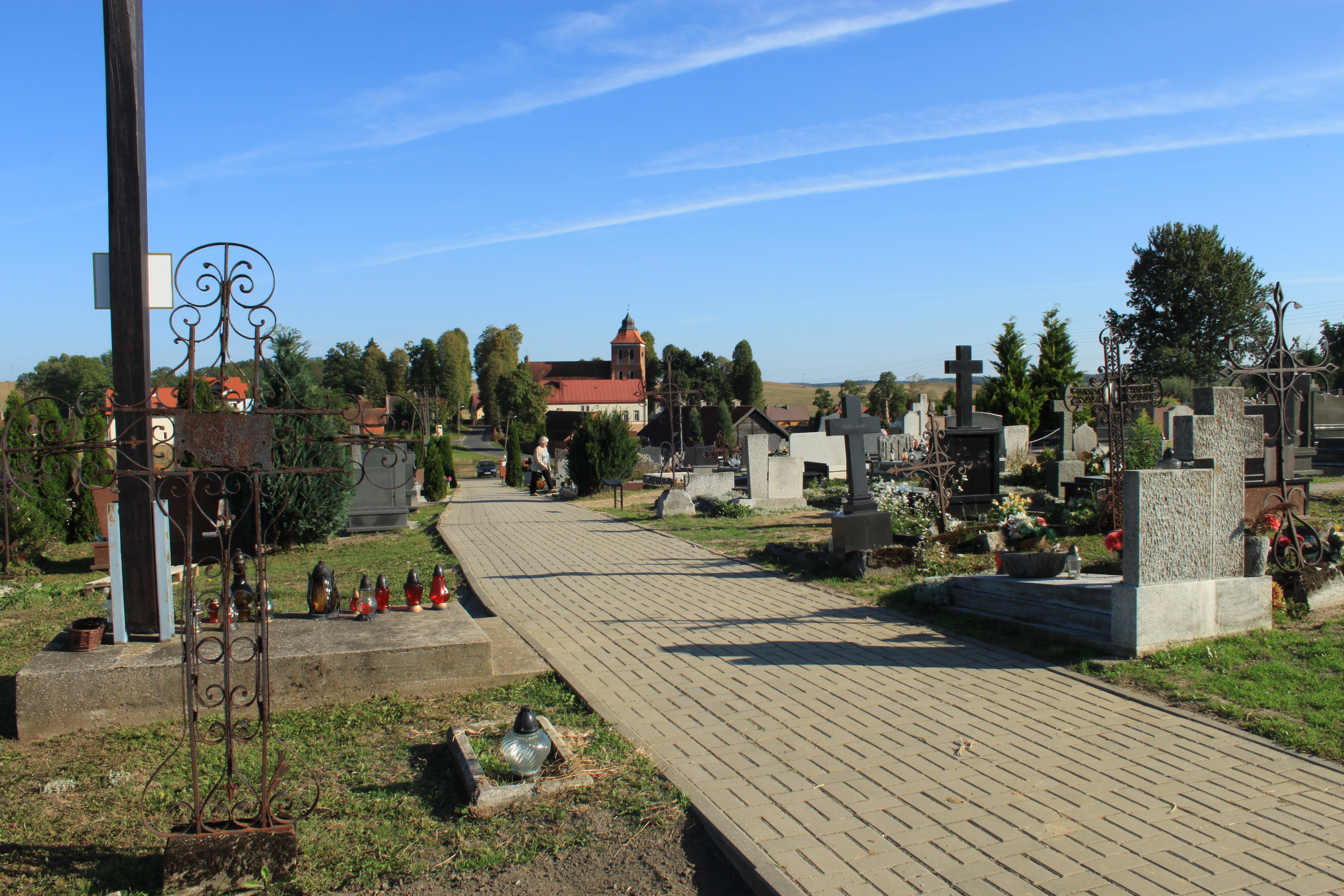
Catholic cemetery
