= Binduga, Warmian-Masurian Voivodeship =

Binduga
- Settlement
- Location within Poland
- Coordinates: 53°41′30″N 20°30′57″E
- Country: Poland
- Voivodeship: Warmian-Masurian
- County: Olsztyn
- Gmina: Stawiguda
- Population: 50
- Time zone: UTC+1 (CET)
  - Summer (DST): UTC+2 (CEST)
- Area code: +48 89
- Vehicle registration: NOL

Binduga [binˈduɡa] is a settlement in the administrative district of Gmina Stawiguda, within Olsztyn County, Warmian-Masurian Voivodeship, in northern Poland. It is located in Warmia.

Before 1772 the area was part of Kingdom of Poland, in 1772–1871 of Prussia, in 1871–1945 of Germany, and again part of Poland since 1945.
