= Słupy, Warmian-Masurian Voivodeship =

Słupy
- Village
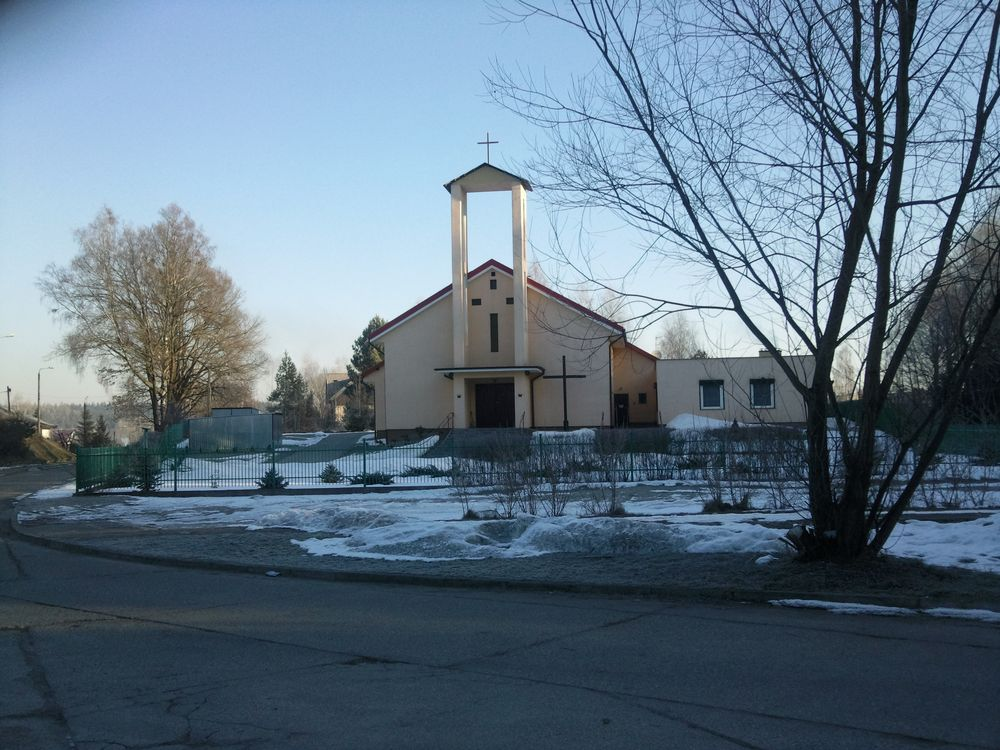

- Location within Poland
- Coordinates: 53°50′29.9″N 20°31′59.3″E
- Country: Poland
- Voivodeship: Warmian-Masurian
- County: v
- Gmina: Dywity

Population
  - Total: 734

Słupy [ˈswupɨ] is a village in the administrative district of Gmina Dywity, within Olsztyn County, Warmian-Masurian Voivodeship, in northern Poland.

Before 1772 the area was part of Kingdom of Poland, and in 1772–1945 it belonged to Prussia and Germany (East Prussia).
