= Frączki, Olsztyn County =

Frączki
- Village
- Location within Poland
- Coordinates: 53°56′N 20°36′E
- Country: Poland
- Voivodeship: Warmian-Masurian
- County: Olsztyn
- Gmina: Dywity
- Population (2011): 285
- Time zone: UTC+1 (CET)
  - Summer (DST): UTC+2 (CEST)
- Postal code: 11-001
- Area code: +48 89
- Vehicle registration: NOL

Frączki [ˈfrɔnt͡ʂki] (Fleming in German) is a village in the administrative district of Gmina Dywity, within Olsztyn County, Warmian-Masurian Voivodeship, in northern Poland. It is located in Warmia.

Before 1772 the area was part of Kingdom of Poland, in 1772–1871 of Prussia, in 1871–1945 of Germany, and of Poland since 1945.

The historic church of St. Mary Magdalene and five typical Warmian old wayside shrines are located in Frączki.
