= Ruś, Olsztyn County =

Ruś
- Village
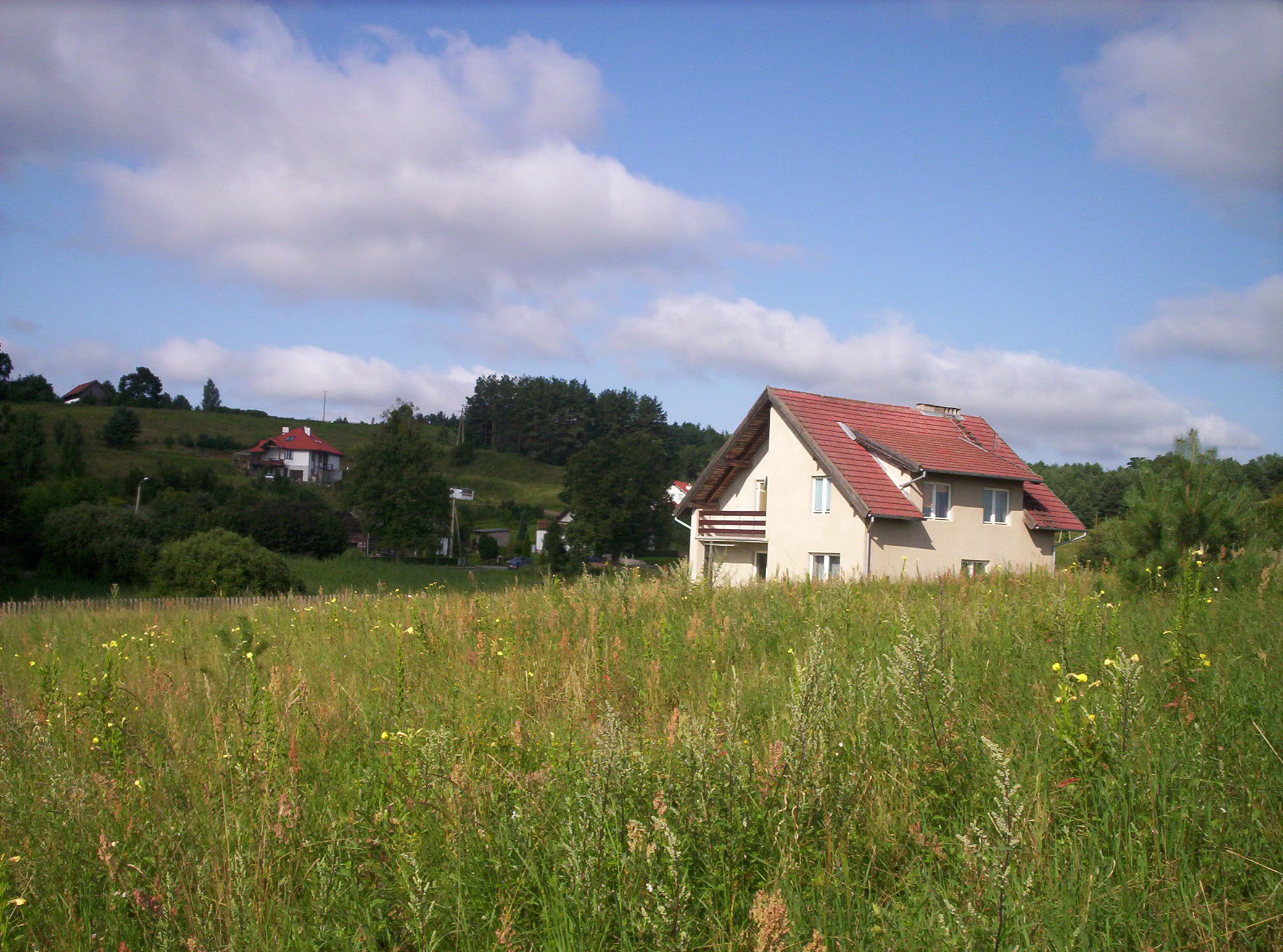

- Location within Poland
- Coordinates: 53°41′31″N 20°29′37″E
- Country: Poland
- Voivodeship: Warmian-Masurian
- County: Olsztyn
- Gmina: Stawiguda
- Population (2011): 424
- Time zone: UTC+1 (CET)
  - Summer (DST): UTC+2 (CEST)
- Area code: +48 89
- Vehicle registration: NOL

Ruś [ruɕ] is a village in the administrative district of Gmina Stawiguda, within Olsztyn County, Warmian-Masurian Voivodeship, in northern Poland. It is located in Warmia.

The village has several historic houses, an old water mill and a Warmian old wayside shrine.

Located in the lands of the Teutonic Order, the area was ceded to Poland in 1466. Until 1772 the area was part of Kingdom of Poland, 1772–1871 Prussia, 1871–1945 Germany, and again Poland since 1945.
