= Miodówko =

- Village
- Location within Poland
- Coordinates: 53°39′N 20°23′E
- Country: Poland
- Voivodeship: Warmian-Masurian
- County: Olsztyn
- Gmina: Stawiguda
- Population (2011): 138
- Time zone: UTC+1 (CET)
  - Summer (DST): UTC+2 (CEST)
- Area code: +48 89
- Vehicle registration: NOL

Miodówko [mjɔˈdufkɔ] is a village in the administrative district of Gmina Stawiguda, within Olsztyn County, Warmian-Masurian Voivodeship, in northern Poland. It is located in Warmia.

A historical Warmian wayside shrine is located in the village.
