= Zezuj =

- Village
- Location within Poland
- Coordinates: 53°39′N 20°23′E
- Country: Poland
- Voivodeship: Warmian-Masurian
- County: Olsztyn
- Gmina: Stawiguda
- Population: 16
- Time zone: UTC+1 (CET)
  - Summer (DST): UTC+2 (CEST)
- Area code: +48 89
- Vehicle registration: NOL

Zezuj [ˈzɛzui̯] is a village in the administrative district of Gmina Stawiguda, within Olsztyn County, Warmian-Masurian Voivodeship, in northern Poland.

Before 1772 the area was part of Kingdom of Poland, in 1772–1871 of Prussia, in 1871–1945 of Germany, and since 1945 of Poland.
