= Ługwałd =

Ługĺałd
- Village
- Location within Poland
- Coordinates: 53°51′N 20°28′E
- Country: Poland
- Voivodeship: Warmian-Masurian
- County: Olsztyn
- Gmina: Dywity

Ługwałd [ˈwuɡvau̯t] is a village in the administrative district of Gmina Dywity, within Olsztyn County, Warmian-Masurian Voivodeship, in northern Poland.
