= Różnowo, Olsztyn County =

Różnowo
- Village
- Location within Poland
- Coordinates: 53°52′N 20°31′E
- Country: Poland
- Voivodeship: Warmian-Masurian
- County: Olsztyn
- Gmina: Dywity
- Population: 1,041

Różnowo [ruʐˈnɔvɔ] is a village in the administrative district of Gmina Dywity, within Olsztyn County, Warmian-Masurian Voivodeship, in northern Poland.
