= Brąswałd =

- Village
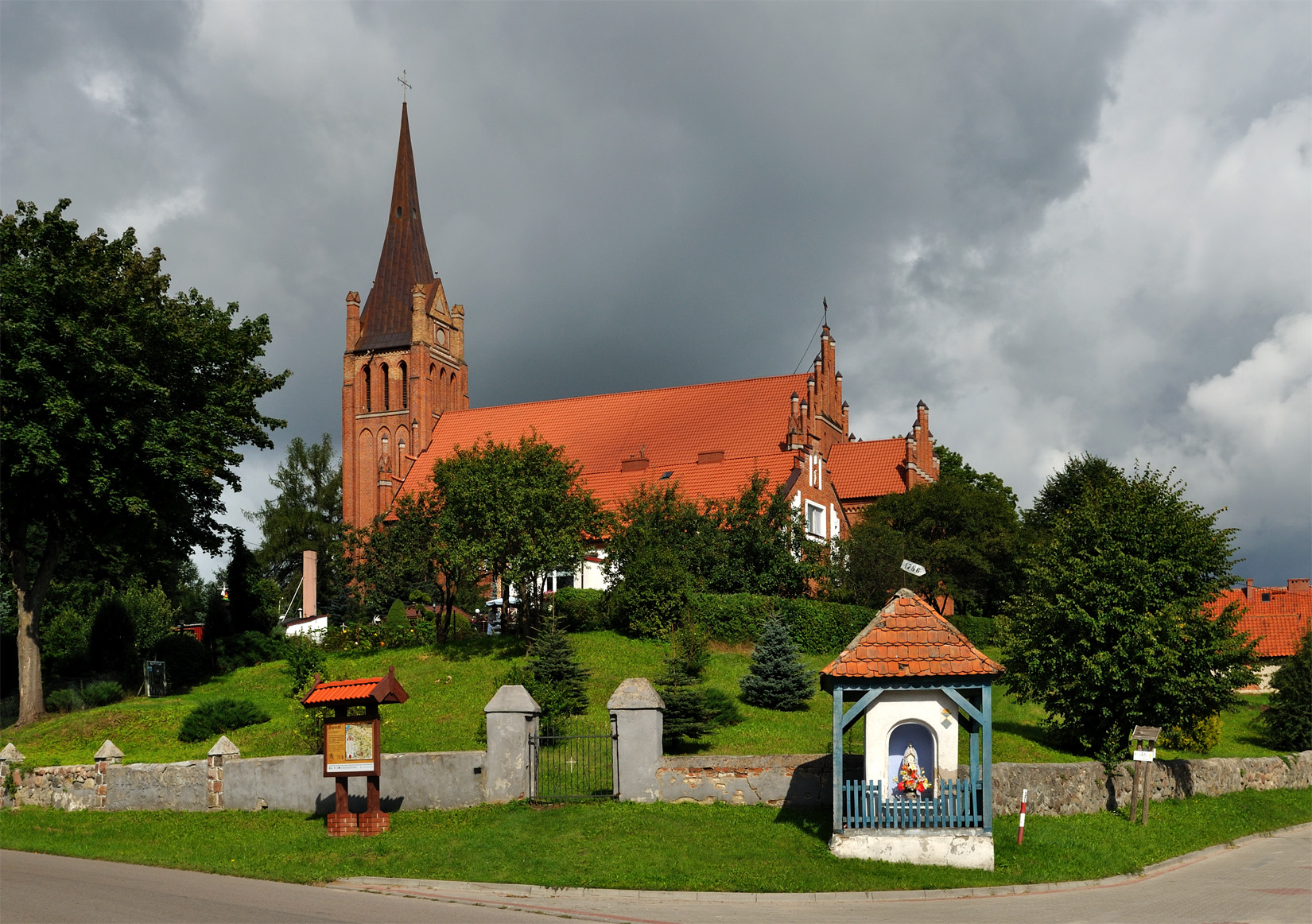
- Saint Catherine church in Brąswałd

- Location within Poland
- Coordinates: 53°51′N 20°25′E
- Country: Poland
- Voivodeship: Warmian-Masurian
- County: Olsztyn
- Gmina: Dywity
- Time zone: UTC+1 (CET)
  - Summer (DST): UTC+2 (CEST)
- Vehicle registration: NOL

Brąswałd [ˈbrɔ̃sfau̯t] is a village in the administrative district of Gmina Dywity, within Olsztyn County, Warmian-Masurian Voivodeship, in northern Poland. It is located in Warmia.

== Notable people ==
- Walenty Barczewski (1856–1928), Polish priest, activist and historian
- Maria Zientara-Malewska (1894–1984), Polish poet, teacher, activist, prisoner of the Ravensbrück concentration camp
