= Stary Dwór, Gmina Stawiguda =

Stary Dwór
- Settlement
- Location within Poland
- Coordinates: 53°44′36″N 20°25′36″E
- Country: Poland
- Voivodeship: Warmian-Masurian
- County: Olsztyn
- Gmina: Stawiguda
- Time zone: UTC+1 (CET)
  - Summer (DST): UTC+2 (CEST)
- Area code: +48 89
- Vehicle registration: NOL

Stary Dwór [ˈstarɨ ˈdvur] is a settlement in the administrative district of Gmina Stawiguda, within Olsztyn County, Warmian-Masurian Voivodeship, in northern Poland. It is located in Warmia.

Before 1772 the area was part of the Kingdom of Poland, in 1772–1871 of Prussia, in 1871–1945 of Germany, and since 1945 of Poland.
