= Sętal =

- Village
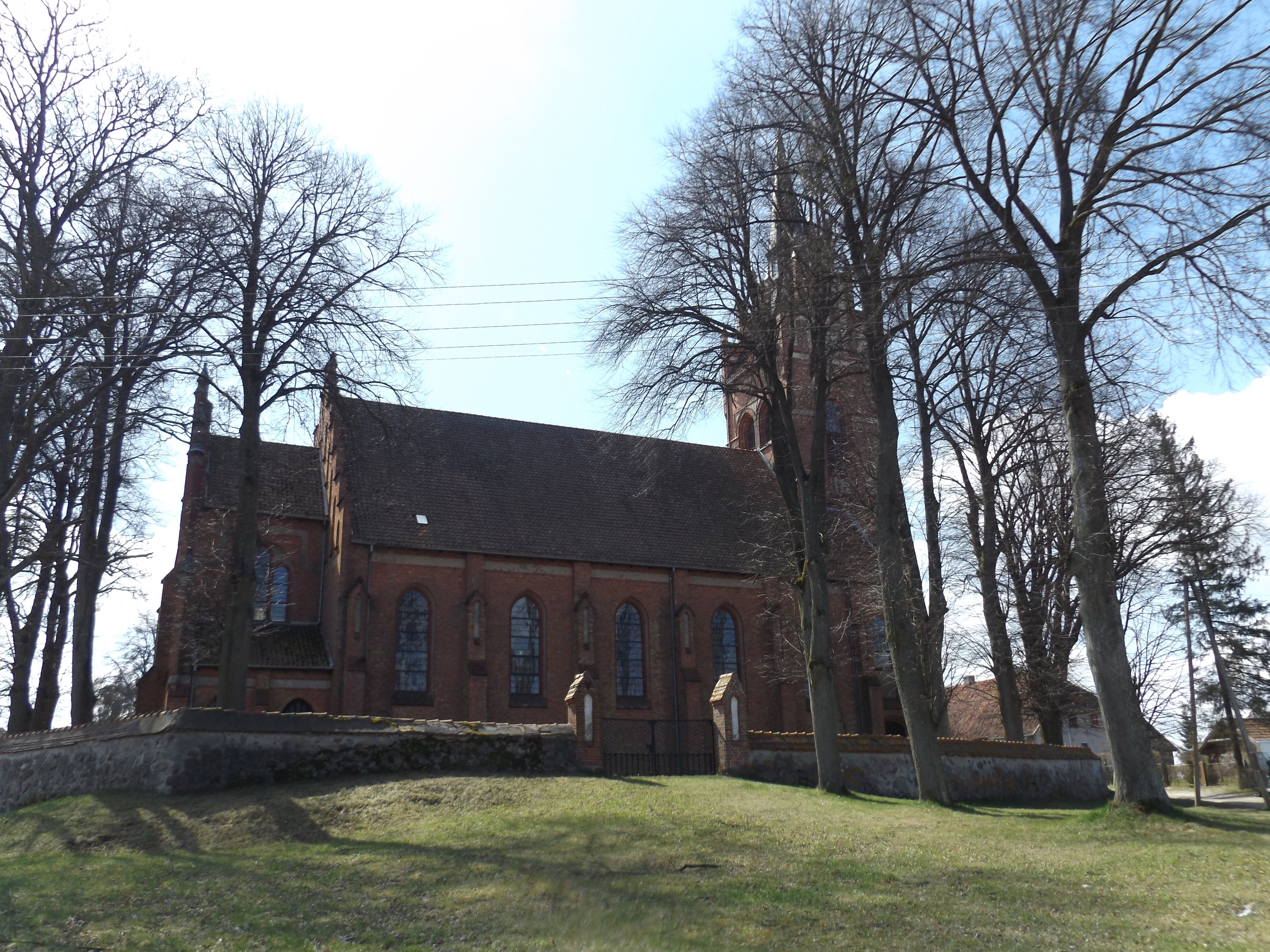
- Saint Nicholas church in Sętal

- Location within Poland
- Coordinates: 53°54′N 20°29′E
- Country: Poland
- Voivodeship: Warmian-Masurian
- County: Olsztyn
- Gmina: Dywity
- Population: 357
- Time zone: UTC+1 (CET)
  - Summer (DST): UTC+2 (CEST)
- Vehicle registration: NOL

Sętal [ˈsɛntal] is a village in the administrative district of Gmina Dywity, within Olsztyn County, Warmian-Masurian Voivodeship, in northern Poland. It is located in Warmia.
