= Dorotowo, Warmian-Masurian Voivodeship =

Dorotowo
- Village
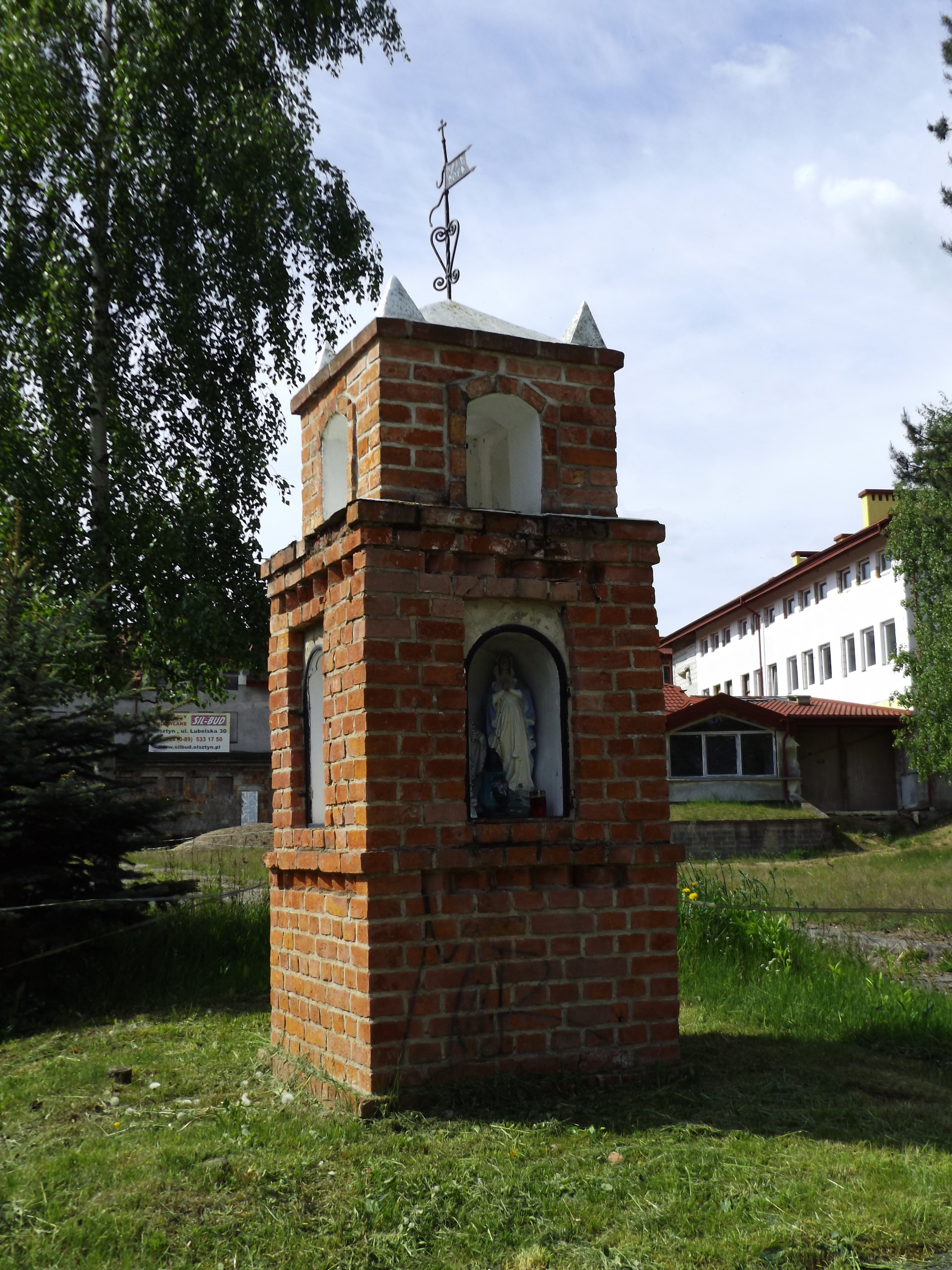
- Warmian old wayside shrine in Dorotowo

- Location within Poland
- Coordinates: 53°42′N 20°25′E
- Country: Poland
- Voivodeship: Warmian-Masurian
- County: Olsztyn
- Gmina: Stawiguda
- Population (2011): 368
- Time zone: UTC+1 (CET)
  - Summer (DST): UTC+2 (CEST)
- Area code: +48 89
- Vehicle registration: NOL

Dorotowo [dɔrɔˈtɔvɔ] is a village in the administrative district of Gmina Stawiguda, within Olsztyn County, Warmian-Masurian Voivodeship, in northern Poland. It is located in Warmia.

Two historic Warmian wayside shrines are located in Dorotowo.

Edward Cyfus (born 1949), Polish regional activist in Warmia, was born in the village.
