= Majdy =

- Village
- Location within Poland
- Coordinates: 53°42′N 20°23′E
- Country: Poland
- Voivodeship: Warmian-Masurian
- County: Olsztyn
- Gmina: Stawiguda
- Population (2011): 128
- Time zone: UTC+1 (CET)
  - Summer (DST): UTC+2 (CEST)
- Area code: +48 89
- Vehicle registration: NOL
- Primary airport: Olsztyn-Mazury Airport

Majdy [ˈmai̯dɨ] is a village in the administrative district of Gmina Stawiguda, within Olsztyn County, Warmian-Masurian Voivodeship, in northern Poland. It is located in Warmia.

In 1864, the village had a population of 111, including 110 Catholic Poles and one Jew.

== Transport ==
The S51 highway runs nearby, east of the village.
