= Gradki =

- Village
- Location within Poland
- Coordinates: 53°55′N 20°33′E
- Country: Poland
- Voivodeship: Warmian-Masurian
- County: Olsztyn
- Gmina: Dywity
- Population (2011): 204
- Time zone: UTC+1 (CET)
  - Summer (DST): UTC+2 (CEST)
- Postal code: 11-001
- Area code: +48 89
- Vehicle registration: NOL

Gradki [ˈɡratki] is a village in the administrative district of Gmina Dywity, within Olsztyn County, Warmian-Masurian Voivodeship, in northern Poland. It is located in Warmia.
