= Pluski =

- Village
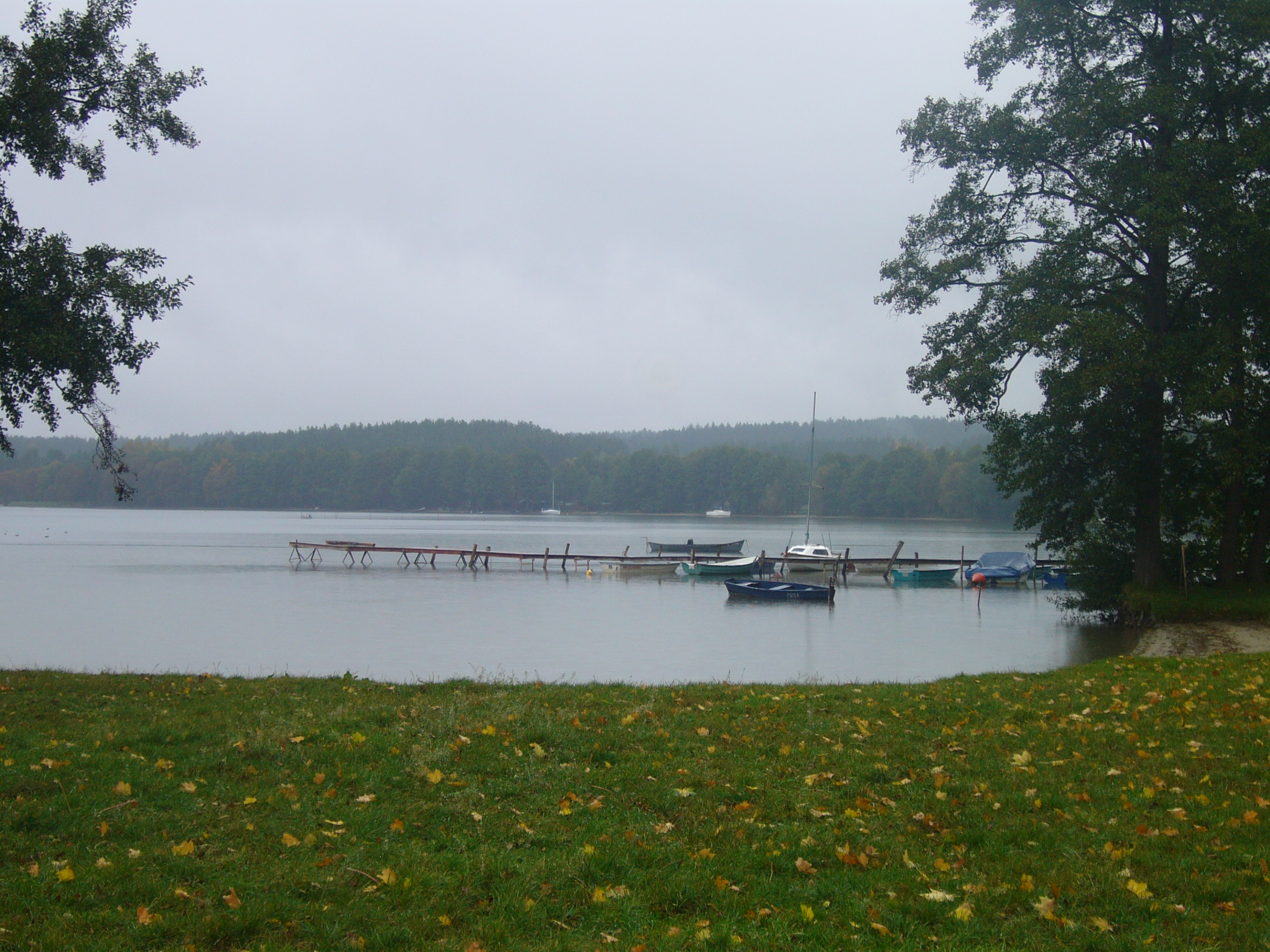

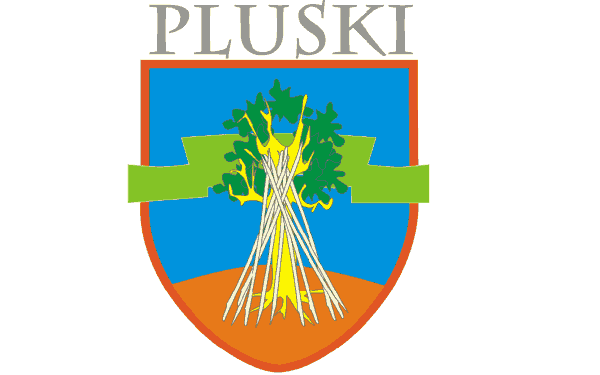
- Coat of arms

- Location within Poland
- Coordinates: 53°36′N 20°25′E
- Country: Poland
- Voivodeship: Warmian-Masurian
- County: Olsztyn
- Gmina: Stawiguda
- Population (2011): 369
- Time zone: UTC+1 (CET)
  - Summer (DST): UTC+2 (CEST)
- Area code: +48 89
- Vehicle registration: NOL

Pluski [ˈpluski] is a village in the administrative district of Gmina Stawiguda, within Olsztyn County, Warmian-Masurian Voivodeship, in northern Poland. It is located in Warmia.

The village has several historic houses.

Before 1772 the area was part of Kingdom of Poland, 1772–1871 Prussia, 1871–1945 Germany, and again Poland since 1945. In 1911, out of 158 children in the village, 149 spoke Polish. A Polish school and library was established in 1920.
