= Owczarnia, Olsztyn County =

Owczarnia
- Settlement
- Location within Poland
- Coordinates: 53°43′30″N 20°29′28″E
- Country: Poland
- Voivodeship: Warmian-Masurian
- County: Olsztyn
- Gmina: Stawiguda
- Time zone: UTC+1 (CET)
  - Summer (DST): UTC+2 (CEST)
- Area code: +48 89
- Vehicle registration: NOL

Owczarnia [ɔfˈt͡ʂarɲa] is a settlement in the administrative district of Gmina Stawiguda, within Olsztyn County, Warmian-Masurian Voivodeship, in northern Poland. It is located in Warmia.
