= Gryźliny, Olsztyn County =

Gryźliny
- Village
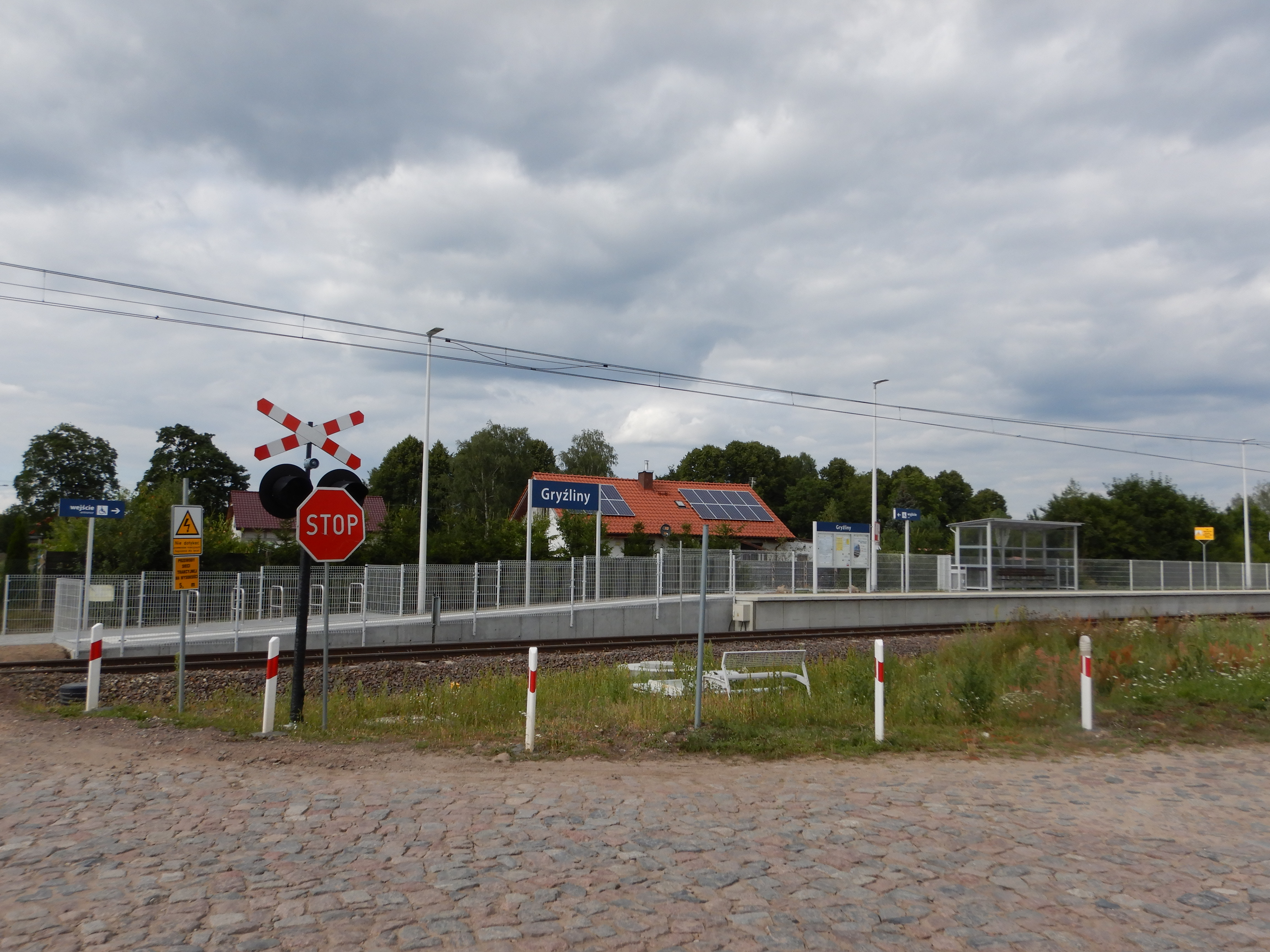
- Gryźliny train station

- Location within Poland
- Coordinates: 53°37′N 20°21′E
- Country: Poland
- Voivodeship: Warmian-Masurian
- County: Olsztyn
- Gmina: Stawiguda
- Population (2011): 614
- Time zone: UTC+1 (CET)
  - Summer (DST): UTC+2 (CEST)
- Area code: +48 89
- Vehicle registration: NOL

Gryźliny [ɡrɨˈʑlinɨ] is a village in the administrative district of Gmina Stawiguda, within Olsztyn County, Warmian-Masurian Voivodeship, in northern Poland. It is located in Warmia.

Gryźliny's landmark is the St. Lawrence church, dating back to the 15th century.

During World War II, the German Luftwaffe operated from an airfield located just southeast of the village.

Jan Baczewski (1890–1958), Polish political activist, co-founder of the Association of National Minorities in Germany, was born in the village.
