= Redykajny =

- Village
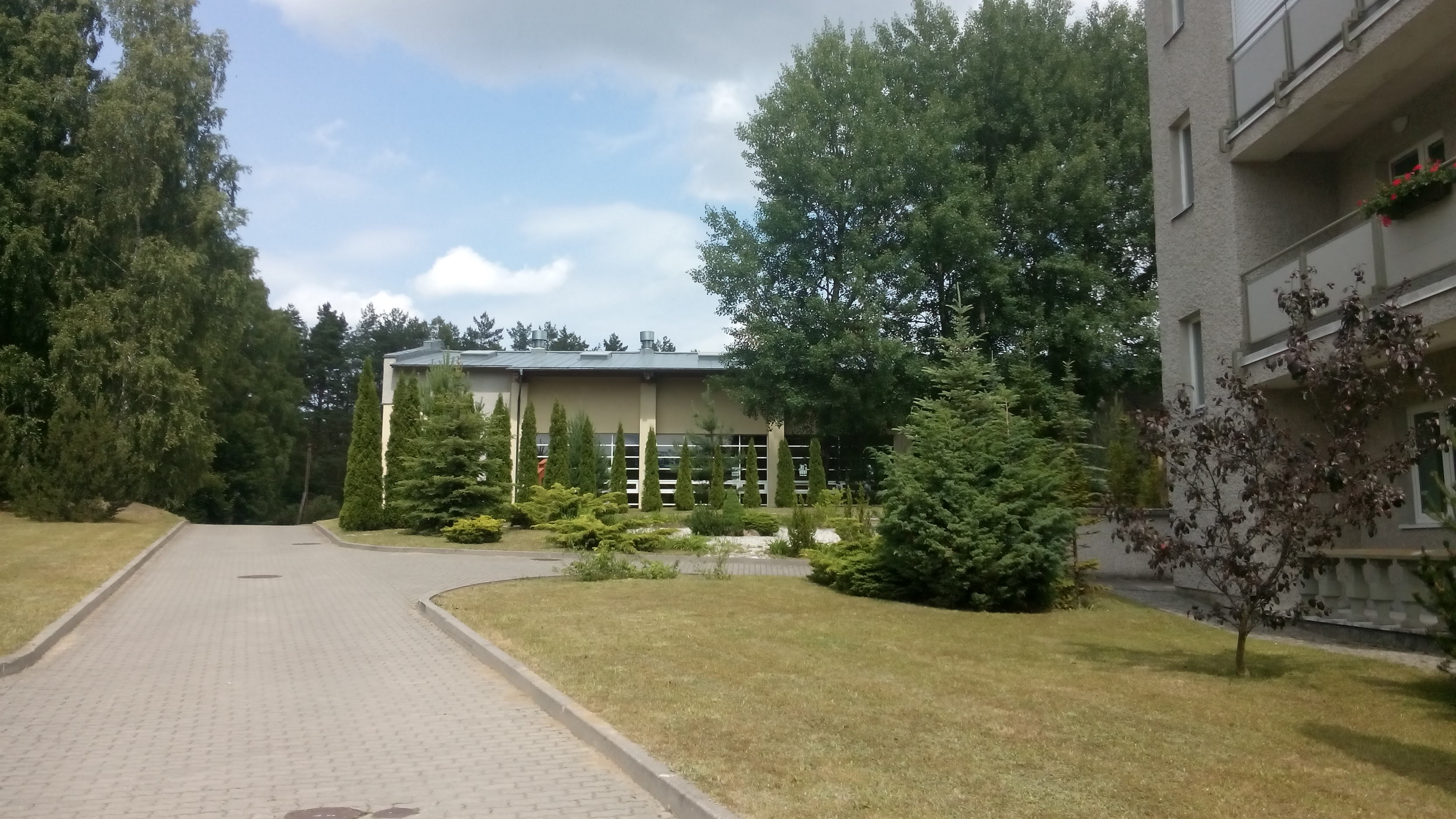

- Location within Poland
- Coordinates: 53°50′N 20°26′E
- Country: Poland
- Voivodeship: Warmian-Masurian
- County: Olsztyn
- Gmina: Dywity
- Population: 72
- Time zone: UTC+1 (CET)
  - Summer (DST): UTC+2 (CEST)
- Vehicle registration: NOL

Redykajny [rɛdɨˈkai̯nɨ] is a village in the administrative district of Gmina Dywity, within Olsztyn County, Warmian-Masurian Voivodeship, in northern Poland. It is located on the northern shore of Lake Redykajny in Warmia.
