= Bukwałd =

- Village
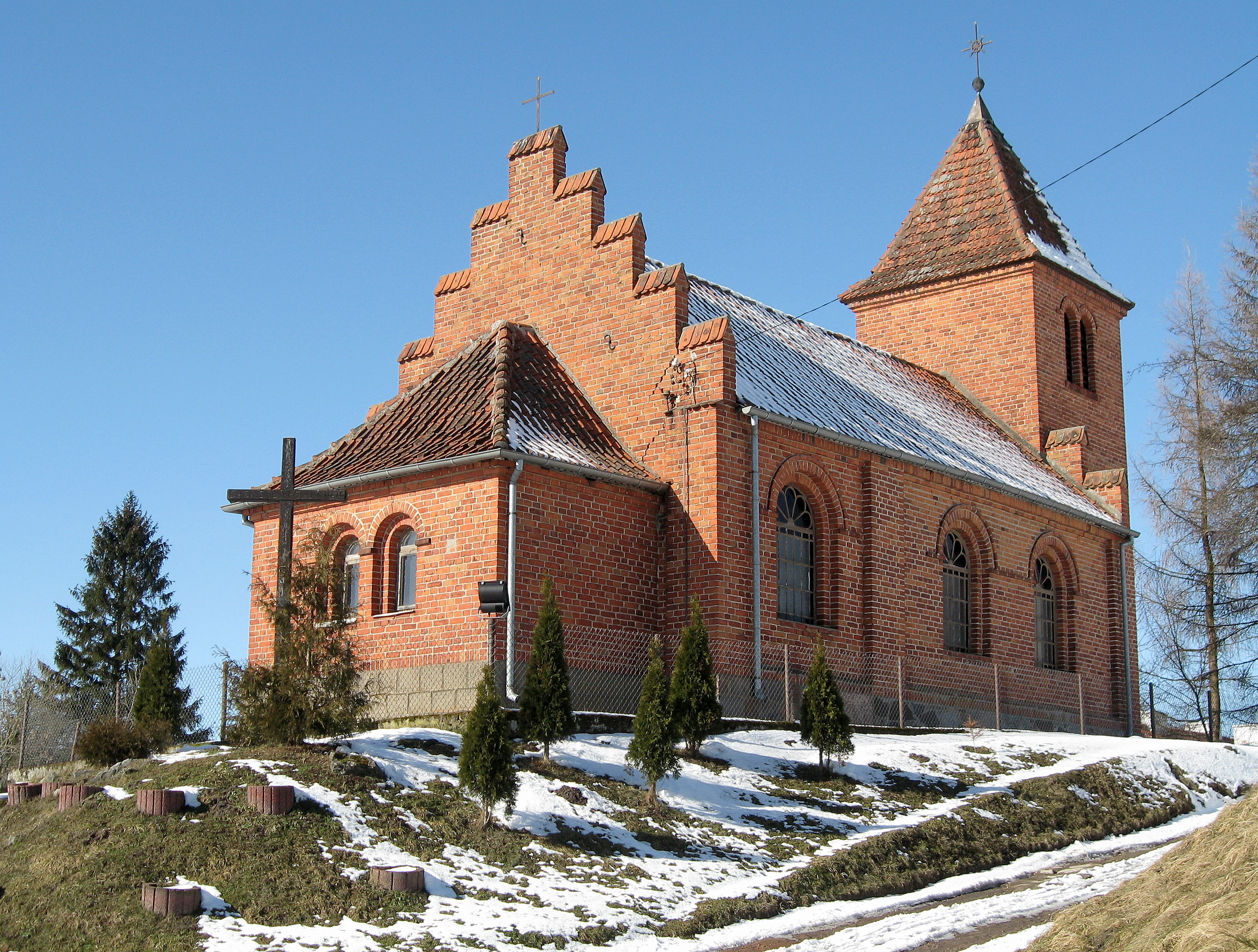
- Saint Joseph chapel in Bukwałd

- Location within Poland
- Coordinates: 53°53′N 20°21′E
- Country: Poland
- Voivodeship: Warmian-Masurian
- County: Olsztyn
- Gmina: Dywity
- Population: 315
- Time zone: UTC+1 (CET)
  - Summer (DST): UTC+2 (CEST)
- Vehicle registration: NOL

Bukwałd [ˈbukfau̯t] is a village in the administrative district of Gmina Dywity, within Olsztyn County, Warmian-Masurian Voivodeship, in northern Poland. It is located on the north-eastern shore of Bukwałdzkie Lake in Warmia.
