= Dywity =

- Village
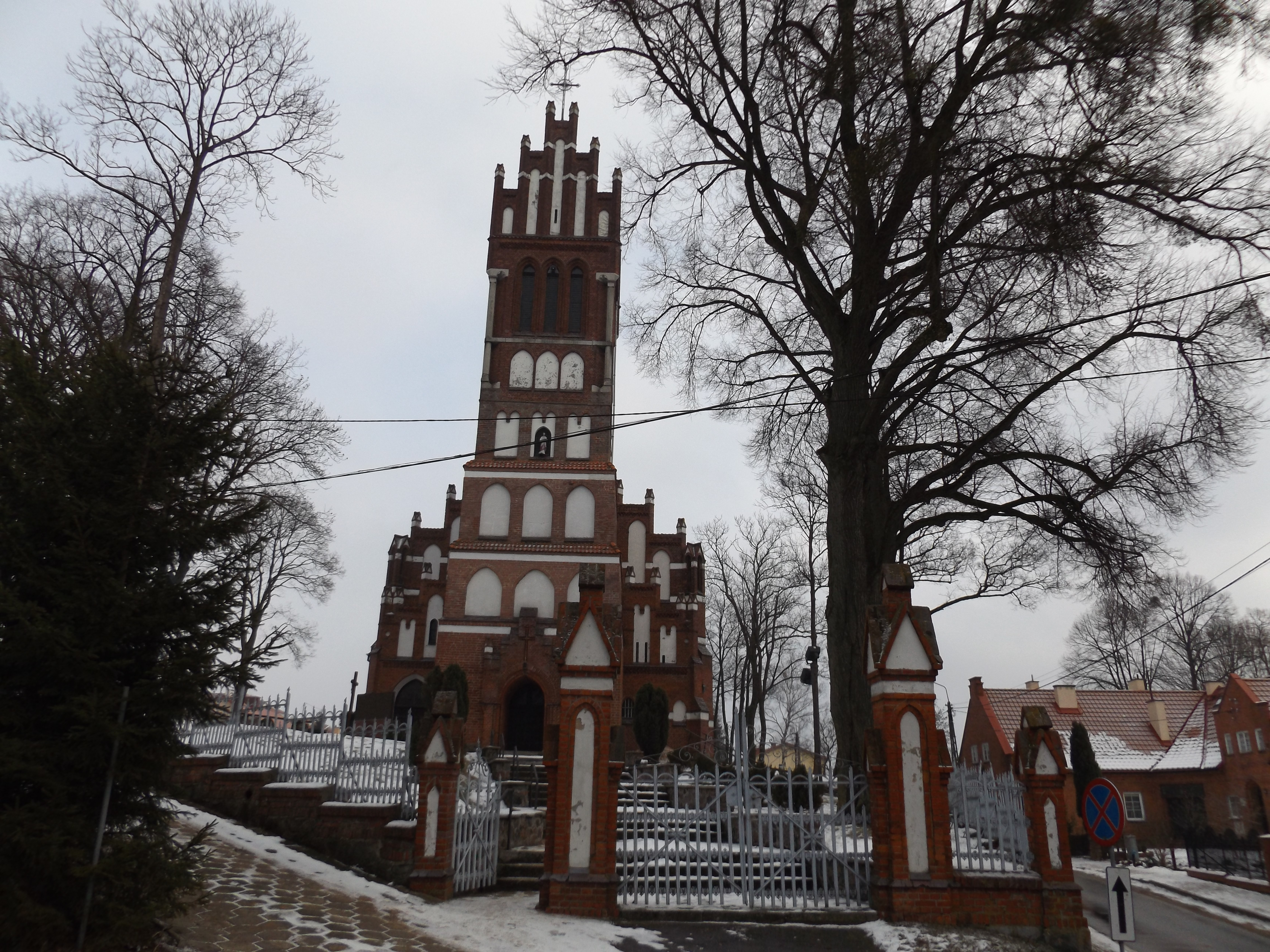
- Saint Simon and Jude church in Dywity

- Location within Poland
- Coordinates: 53°51′N 20°29′E
- Country: Poland
- Voivodeship: Warmian-Masurian
- County: Olsztyn
- Gmina: Dywity

Population
  - Total: 2,300
- Time zone: UTC+1 (CET)
  - Summer (DST): UTC+2 (CEST)
- Vehicle registration: NOL
- Primary airport: Olsztyn-Mazury Airport

Dywity [dɨˈvitɨ] is a village in Olsztyn County, Warmian-Masurian Voivodeship, in northern Poland. It is the seat of the gmina (administrative district) called Gmina Dywity. It is located on the Dywickie Lake in Warmia.

== History ==
The village was first mentioned in 1354. It was visited by Nicolaus Copernicus who organized new settlement in the village in the 16th century. In the late 19th century, the population of the village was overwhelmingly Polish. In 1910, it was inhabited by 328 Poles.
