= Gmina Dywity =

Gmina Dywity Dywity Commune
- Gmina
- Interactive map of Gmina Dywity
- Coordinates (Dywity): 53°51′N 20°29′E
- Country: Poland
- Voivodeship: Warmian-Masurian
- County: Olsztyn County
- Seat: Dywity

Area
  - Total: 160.68 km^{2} (62.04 sq mi)

Population (2006)
  - Total: 9,148
  - Density: 56.93/km^{2} (147.5/sq mi)

Gmina Dywity is a rural gmina (administrative district) in Olsztyn County, Warmian-Masurian Voivodeship, in northern Poland. Its seat is the village of Dywity, which lies approximately 8 kilometres (5 mi) north of the regional capital Olsztyn.

The gmina covers an area of 160.68 square kilometres (62.0 sq mi), and as of 2006 its total population is 9,148.

== Villages ==
Gmina Dywity contains the villages and settlements of Barkweda, Brąswałd, Bukwałd, Dąbrówka Wielka, Dywity, Frączki, Gady, Gradki, Kieźliny, Ługwałd, Myki, Nowe Włóki, Plutki, Redykajny, Rozgity, Różnowo, Sętal, Słupy, Spręcowo, Tuławki, Wadąg and Zalbki.

== Neighbouring gminas ==
Gmina Dywity is bordered by the city of Olsztyn and by the gminas of Barczewo, Dobre Miasto, Jeziorany, Jonkowo and Świątki.
