= Stawiguda =

- Village
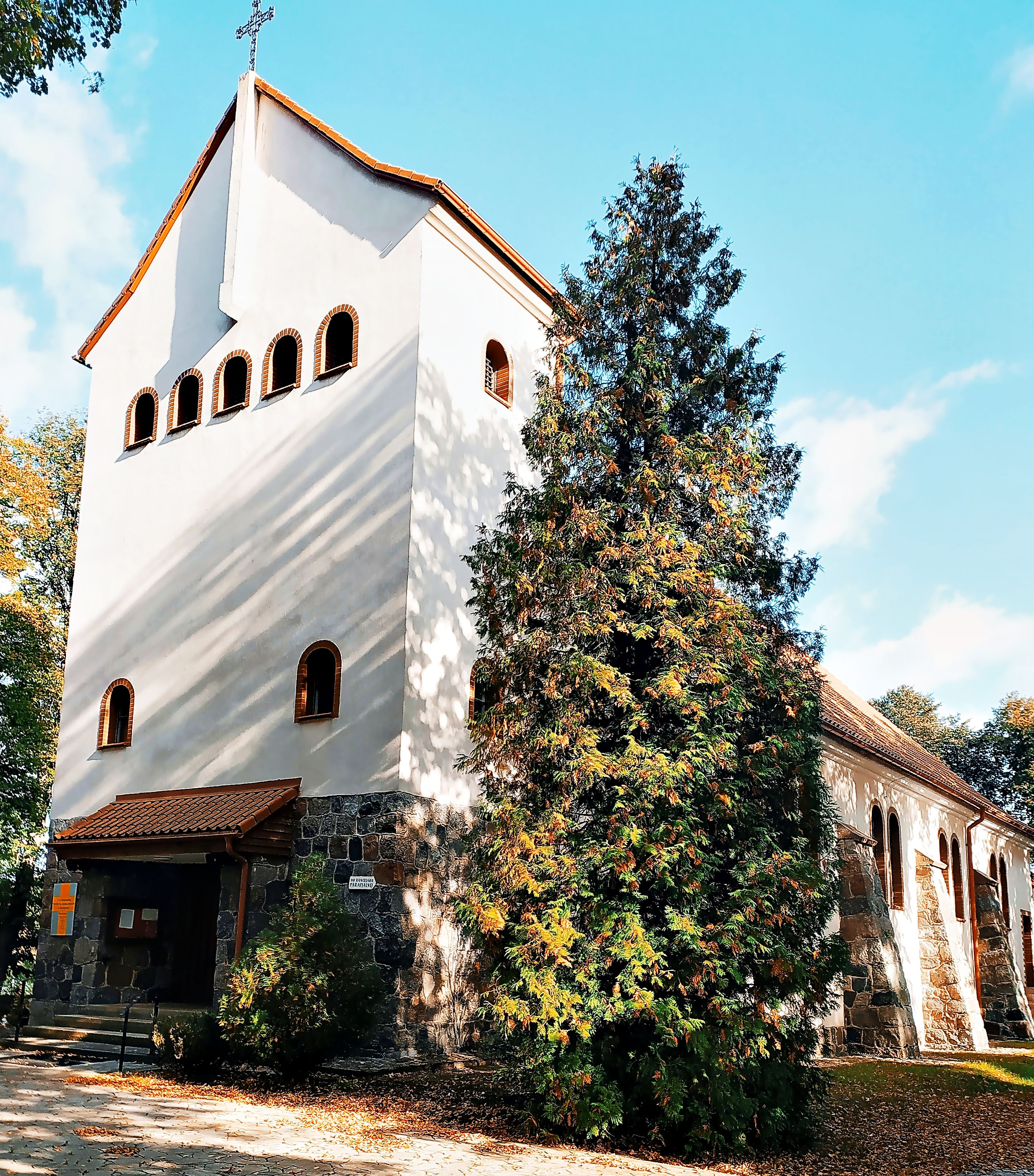
- Saint James church in Stawiguda

- Location within Poland
- Coordinates: 53°39′31″N 20°23′59″E
- Country: Poland
- Voivodeship: Warmian-Masurian
- County: Olsztyn
- Gmina: Stawiguda
- Founded: 1357

Population (2011)
  - Total: 1,639
- Time zone: UTC+1 (CET)
  - Summer (DST): UTC+2 (CEST)
- Postal code: 11-034
- Area code: +48 89
- Vehicle registration: NOL
- Website: http://www.stawiguda.com.pl

Stawiguda [staviˈɡuda] is a village in Olsztyn County, Warmian-Masurian Voivodeship, in northern Poland. It is the seat of the gmina (administrative district) called Gmina Stawiguda. It is located in Warmia.

The historic church of St. James is located in Stawiguda.

The village was founded in 1357 by the cathedral chapter of the Diocese of Warmia.
