= Gmina Stawiguda =

Gmina Stawiguda Stawiguda Commune
- Gmina
- Coat of arms
- Interactive map of Gmina Stawiguda
- Coordinates (Stawiguda): 53°39′31″N 20°23′59″E
- Country: Poland
- Voivodeship: Warmian-Masurian
- County: Olsztyn County
- Seat: Stawiguda

Area
  - Total: 222.52 km^{2} (85.92 sq mi)

Population (2006)
  - Total: 5,134
  - Density: 23.07/km^{2} (59.76/sq mi)
- Website: http://www.stawiguda.com.pl

Gmina Stawiguda is a rural gmina (administrative district) in Olsztyn County, Warmian-Masurian Voivodeship, in northern Poland. Its seat is the village of Stawiguda, which lies approximately 16 kilometres (10 mi) south-west of the regional capital Olsztyn.

The gmina covers an area of 222.52 square kilometres (85.9 sq mi), and as of 2006 its total population is 5,134.

== Villages ==
Gmina Stawiguda contains the villages and settlements of Bartąg, Bartążek, Binduga, Ćwikielnia, Dorotowo, Gągławki, Grada, Gryźliny, Jaroty, Kręsk, Majdy, Miodówko, Owczarnia, Pluski, Ruś, Rybaki, Stary Dwór, Stawiguda, Tomaszkowo, Wymój, Zazdrość, Zezuj, Zielonowo and Zofijówka.

== Neighbouring gminas ==
Gmina Stawiguda is bordered by the city of Olsztyn and by the gminas of Gietrzwałd, Olsztynek and Purda.
