= Olsztyn County =

Olsztyn County Powiat olsztyński
- County
- Coat of arms

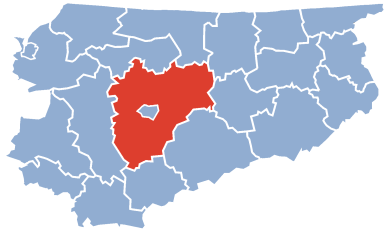
- Location within the voivodeship

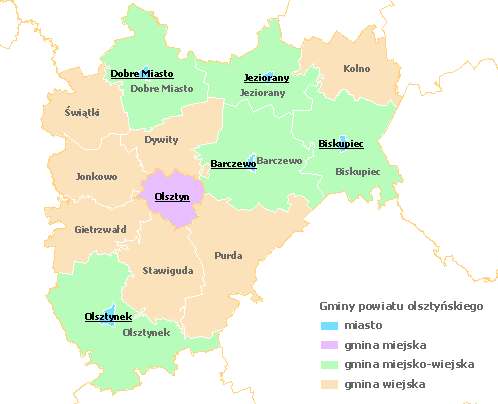
- Division into gminas
- Coordinates (Olsztyn): 53°47′N 20°30′E
- Country: Poland
- Voivodeship: Warmian-Masurian
- Seat: Olsztyn
- Gminas: Total 12: Gmina Barczewo; Gmina Biskupiec; Gmina Dobre Miasto; Gmina Dywity; Gmina Gietrzwałd; Gmina Jeziorany; Gmina Jonkowo; Gmina Kolno; Gmina Olsztynek; Gmina Purda; Gmina Stawiguda; Gmina Świątki

Area
  - Total: 2,840.29 km^{2} (1,096.64 sq mi)

Population (2006)
  - Total: 113,529
  - Density: 39.9709/km^{2} (103.524/sq mi)
  - Urban: 39,205
  - Rural: 74,324
- Car plates: NOL
- Website: www.powiat-olsztynski.pl

Olsztyn County (Polish: powiat olsztyński) is a unit of territorial administration and local government (powiat) in Warmian-Masurian Voivodeship, northern Poland. It came into being on January 1, 1999, as a result of the Polish local government reforms passed in 1998. Its administrative seat is the city of Olsztyn, although the city is not part of the county (it constitutes a separate city county). The county contains five towns: Dobre Miasto, 24 km (15 mi) north of Olsztyn, Biskupiec, 31 km (19 mi) east of Olsztyn, Olsztynek, 27 km (17 mi) south-west of Olsztyn, Barczewo, 14 km (9 mi) north-east of Olsztyn, and Jeziorany, 26 km (16 mi) north-east of Olsztyn.

The county covers an area of 2,840.29 square kilometres (1,096.6 sq mi). As of 2006 its total population is 113,529, out of which the population of Dobre Miasto is 10,489, that of Biskupiec is 10,348, that of Olsztynek is 7,591, that of Barczewo is 7,401, that of Jeziorany is 3,376, and the rural population is 74,324.

According to data from June 30, 2020, the county was inhabited by 127,205 people.

== Neighbouring counties ==
Apart from the city of Olsztyn, Olsztyn County is also bordered by Lidzbark County and Bartoszyce County to the north, Kętrzyn County and Mrągowo County to the east, Szczytno County to the south-east, Nidzica County to the south, and Ostróda County to the west.

== Administrative divisions ==
The county is subdivided into 12 gminas (five urban-rural and seven rural). These are listed in the following table, in descending order of population.

Gmina	Type	Area (km^{2})	Population (2006)	Seat
Gmina Biskupiec	urban-rural	290.4	19,018	Biskupiec
Gmina Barczewo	urban-rural	319.9	16,525	Barczewo
Gmina Dobre Miasto	urban-rural	258.7	15,920	Dobre Miasto
Gmina Olsztynek	urban-rural	372.0	13,666	Olsztynek
Gmina Dywity	rural	160.7	9,148	Dywity
Gmina Jeziorany	urban-rural	213.5	8,140	Jeziorany
Gmina Purda	rural	318.2	7,268	Purda
Gmina Jonkowo	rural	168.2	5,719	Jonkowo
Gmina Gietrzwałd	rural	174.1	5,315	Gietrzwałd
Gmina Stawiguda	rural	222.5	5,134	Stawiguda
Gmina Świątki	rural	163.8	4,234	Świątki
Gmina Kolno	rural	178.3	3,442	Kolno
