= Sigismund III Vasa =

Ruler of Poland–Lithuania (1587–1632), King of Sweden (1592–1599)

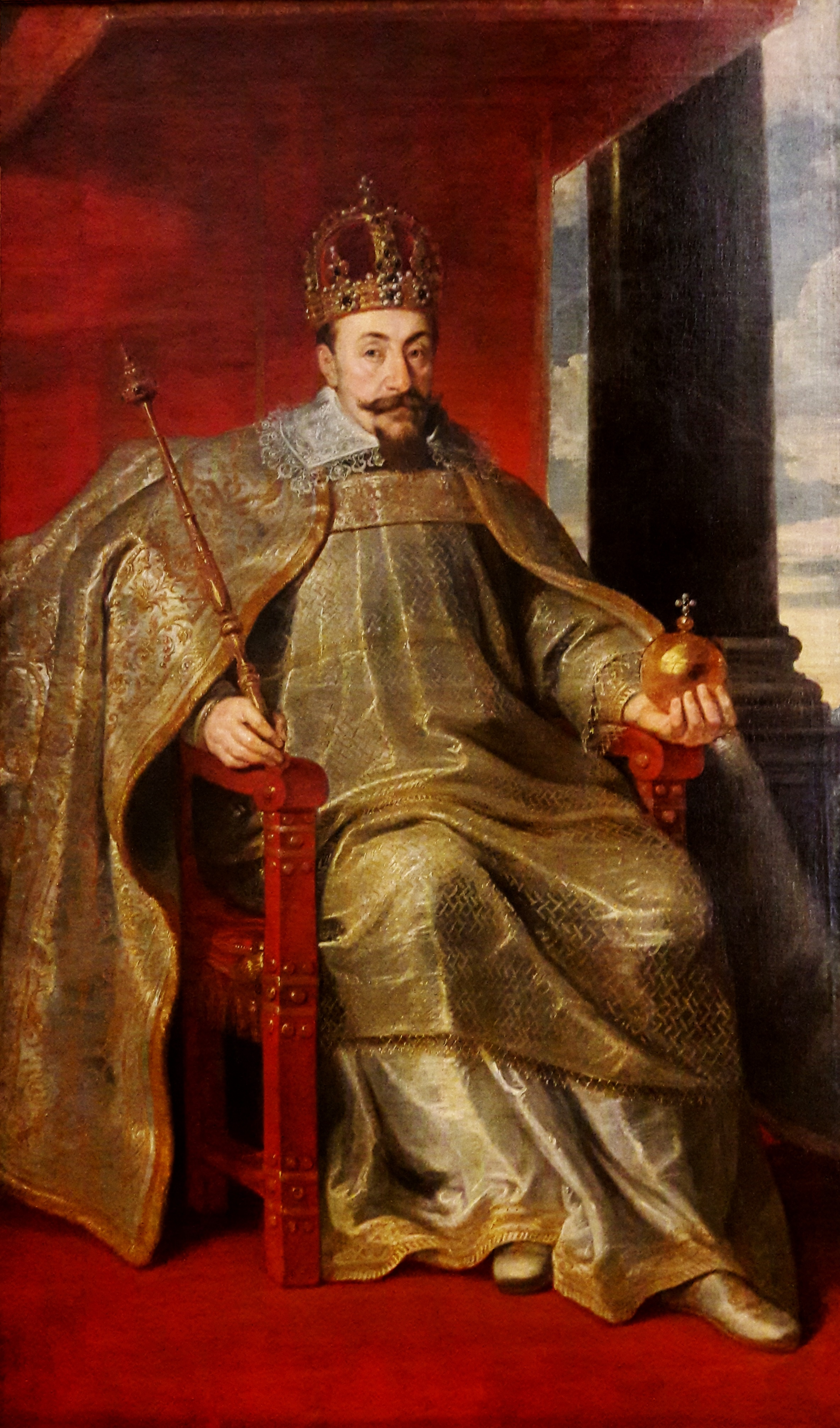
- Portrait by Pieter Soutman, c. 1624

King of Poland; Grand Duke of Lithuania
- Reign: 19 August 1587 – 30 April 1632
- Coronation: 27 December 1587
- Predecessor: Anna Jagiellon and Stephen Báthory
- Successor: Władysław IV Vasa

King of Sweden
- Reign: 17 November 1592 – 24 July 1599
- Coronation: 19 February 1594
- Predecessor: John III
- Successor: Charles IX
- Born: 20 June 1566; Gripsholm, Mariefred, Sweden
- Died: 30 April 1632 (aged 65); Warsaw, Poland
- Burial: 4 February 1633; Wawel Cathedral, Kraków
- Spouses: Anne of Austria (m. 1592; died 1598) Constance of Austria (m. 1605; died 1631)
- Issue among others...: Anna Maria Vasa; Władysław IV Vasa; John II Casimir Vasa; John Albert, Bishop of Warmia and Kraków; Charles Ferdinand, Duke of Opole; Anna Catherine Constance, Hereditary Countess Palatine of Neuburg
- House: Vasa
- Father: John III of Sweden
- Mother: Catherine Jagiellon
- Religion: Catholicism

Sigismund III Vasa (Polish: Zygmunt III Waza, Lithuanian: Žygimantas Vaza; 20 June 1566 – 30 April 1632 N.S.) was King of Poland and Grand Duke of Lithuania from 1587 to 1632 and, as Sigismund, King of Sweden from 1592 to 1599. He was the first Polish sovereign from the House of Vasa. Zealously religious, he imposed Catholicism across the vast realm, and his crusades against neighbouring states marked Poland's largest territorial expansion. A deeply polarising ruler, he presided over the end of the Golden Age of prosperity and achievement, further distinguished by the transfer of the country's capital from Kraków to Warsaw.

Sigismund was the son of King John III of Sweden and his first wife, Catherine Jagiellon, daughter of King Sigismund I of Poland. Elected monarch of the Polish–Lithuanian Commonwealth in 1587, he sought to unify Poland and Sweden under one Catholic kingdom, and when he succeeded his deceased father in 1592, the Polish–Swedish union was created. Opposition in Protestant Sweden caused a war against Sigismund headed by Sigismund's uncle Charles IX of Sweden, who deposed him in 1599.

Sigismund attempted to hold absolute power in all his dominions and frequently undermined parliament. He suppressed internal opposition, strengthened Catholic influence and granted privileges to the Jesuits, whom he employed as advisors and spies during the Counter-Reformation. He actively interfered in the affairs of neighbouring countries; his successful invasion of Russia during the Time of Troubles resulted in the seizure of Smolensk and occupation of Moscow, resulting in Poland's historical greatest territorial extent. Sigismund's army also defeated the Ottoman forces in southeastern Europe, which hastened the downfall of Sultan Osman II. However, the Polish–Swedish conflict had a less favourable outcome. After a series of skirmishes ending in a truce, King Gustavus Adolphus of Sweden launched a campaign against the Commonwealth and annexed parts of Polish Livonia.

Sigismund to this day remains a controversial figure in Poland. One of the country's most recognisable monarchs, his long reign partially coincided with the Polish Golden Age, the apex in the prestige, power and economic influence of the Polish–Lithuanian Commonwealth. On the other hand, it was also during his rule that the seeds of decline surfaced. Considerable contributions to the arts and architecture, as well as military victories, were tarnished by intrigues, religious conflicts and giving up Ducal Prussia to the elector of Brandenburg. He was commemorated in Warsaw by Sigismund's Column, one of the city's chief landmarks and the first secular monument in the form of a column in modern history. It was commissioned after Sigismund's death by his son and successor, Władysław IV Vasa.

== Early life ==
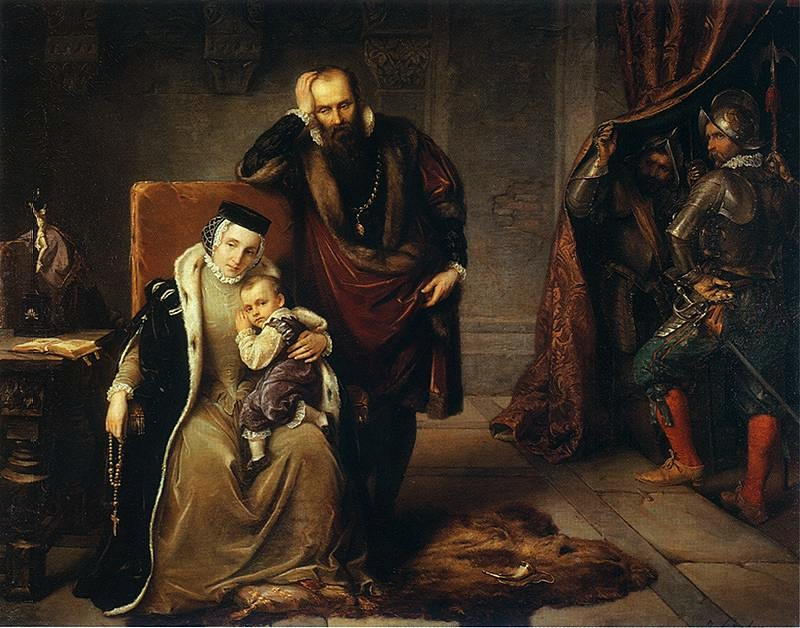
John III, his wife Catherine Jagiellon and young Sigismund imprisoned at Gripsholm, as imagined in an 1859 painting by Józef Simmler

Born on 20 June 1566 at Gripsholm Castle, Sigismund was the second child and only son of Catherine Jagiellon and Grand Duke John III of Sweden, who was a son of King Gustav I of Sweden. The couple was being held prisoner at Gripsholm since 1563 when John staged a failed rebellion against his deranged brother Eric XIV of Sweden. Although Protestant Christians were growing political wing in Poland at the time, Sigismund was raised as a Catholic. His mother Catherine was the daughter of Polish king Sigismund I the Old and Bona Sforza of Milan, all of whom where practicing Catholics. Sigismund's older sister Isabella died aged two in 1566. His younger sister Anna Vasa of Sweden was a Lutheran, but the close relationship between the two siblings remained unchanged until her death in 1625.

In October 1567, Sigismund and his parents were released from prison at the request of his uncle Charles IX of Sweden. In January 1569, Erik XIV was deposed and Sigismund's father ascended the throne of Sweden as John III. He maintained good relations with his father despite John's second marriage to Gunilla Bielke, a Protestant noble lady of lower status and Catherine's former maid of honour. In 1589, Sigismund's half-brother John, the future Duke of Östergötland, was born.

As a child, Sigismund was tutored in both Polish and Swedish, thus making him bilingual. He was also proficient in German, Italian, and Latin. Catherine ensured that her son was educated in the spirit of Catholicism and Polish patriotism; the young prince was made aware of his blood connection to the Jagiellonian dynasty which ruled Poland in its finest period for two hundred years. Although Sigismund in his youth enjoyed reading and learning, observers did not acknowledge his intelligence. He was handsome, rather tall, and of slim build, but timid and an introvert who became heavily influenced by the teachings of the church. Nevertheless, Sigismund was undoubtedly multitalented and artistically inclined.

== Accession ==
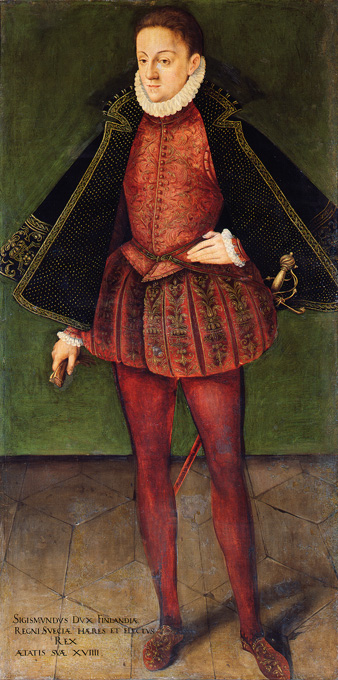
Sigismund in his youth, 1585

In 1587, Sigismund stood for election to the Polish throne after the death of Stephen Báthory. His candidacy was secured by Queen Dowager Anna and several elite magnates who considered him a native candidate as a descendant of the Jagiellons, though the election was openly questioned and opposed by the nobles politically associated with the Zborowski family. With the blessing of primate Stanisław Karnkowski and strong support from other people of influence, he was duly elected ruler of the Polish–Lithuanian Commonwealth on 19 August 1587. His official name and title became "by the grace of God, king of Poland, grand duke of Lithuania, ruler of Ruthenia, Prussia, Masovia, Samogitia, Livonia and also hereditary king of the Swedes, Goths and Wends"; the latter titles being a reference to the fact that he was already the Crown Prince of Sweden, and thus would lawfully succeed to the throne of Sweden upon the death of his father.

The outcome of the election was strongly contested by factions of the Polish nobility that backed the candidacy of Archduke Maximilian III of Austria, who launched a military expedition. When the news reached Sigismund in Sweden, he crossed the Baltic Sea and landed in Poland on 7 October, immediately agreeing to grant royal privileges to the Sejm (parliament) in the hope of calming the opposition and settling the disputed election. He was proclaimed king by Treasurer Jan Dulski on behalf of Crown Marshal Andrzej Opaliński, and after arriving in the Royal Capital City of Kraków he was crowned on 27 December at Wawel Cathedral.

Sigismund's position was solidified when Jan Zamoyski defeated Maximilian at the Battle of Byczyna and took him prisoner. At the request of Pope Sixtus V, the Archduke was then released and in turn surrendered his claim to Poland in 1589. He was also successful in maintaining peace with his powerful southern neighbour by marrying Archduchess Anne of Habsburg in 1592. Simultaneously, he secured an alliance with Catholic Austria against Protestant foes.

When his father died, Sigismund was granted permission by the Polish Diet to claim the Swedish crown, which he had inherited from his father. The Swedes, who previously declared John III a Catholic conspirator and traitor, became lenient when the new monarch pledged to respect Lutheranism as the country's new state religion. Sigismund was crowned at Uppsala on 19 February 1594, but his promise to uphold the Protestant faith in Sweden began on shaky ground, as demonstrated by the presence of a papal nuncio in the royal procession. Tensions grew following his coronation. Sigismund remained a devout Catholic and left the country abruptly, which made the Swedes sceptical of their new ruler. After returning to Poland, he appointed his uncle, Duke Charles, to rule as his regent. Sigismund's ultimate intention was to reinstate Catholicism in Sweden, by force if necessary. The Jesuits often acted as agents refuting Protestantism and promoting Catholicism in the country.

== Opposition ==
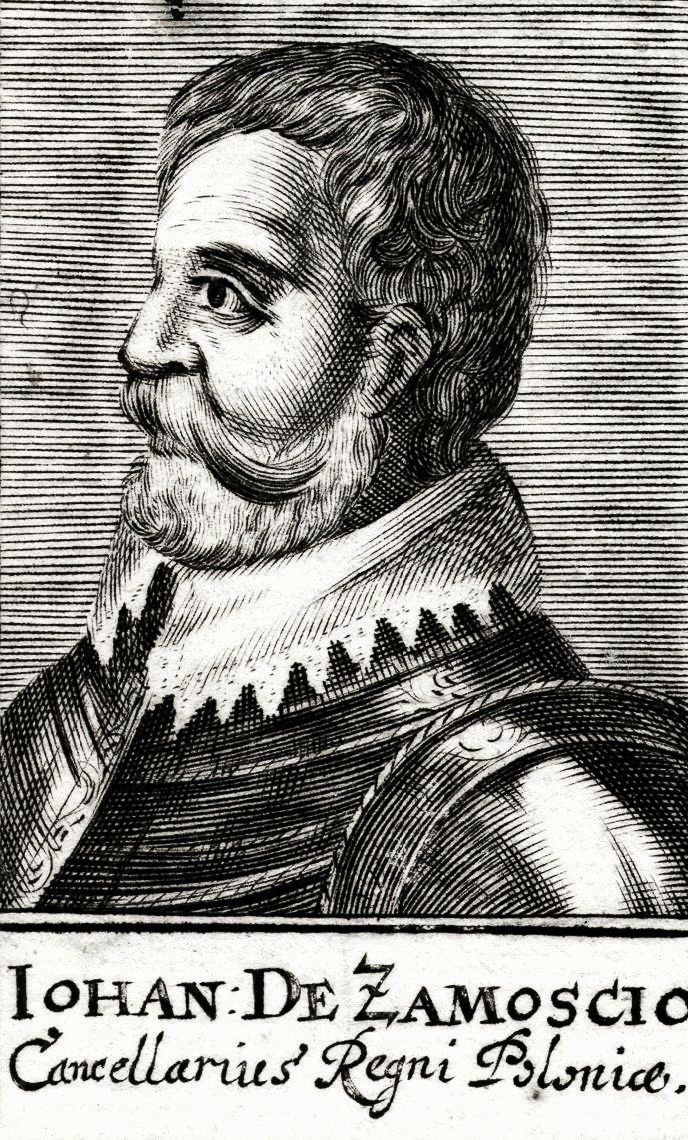
Chancellor Jan Zamoyski staunchly opposed the pro-Habsburg alliance.

The hostility between Chancellor Jan Zamoyski and Sigismund III began as soon as he arrived in Poland from Sweden to claim the crown. Zamoyski, a patriotic brawler, along with other magnates were critical of the young king's liking for the Habsburg culture, certain habits and impassive cold character. According to historian and writer Julian Ursyn Niemcewicz, Zamoyski was said to have exclaimed "what a mute have you brought to us" upon meeting the king in October 1587. The Chancellor was initially supportive of Sigismund's candidacy due to his maternal lineage. During the first parliament sitting, the so-called Pacification Sejm, in March 1589, Zamoyski proposed extensive reforms of the electoral system; notably, he presented the idea that only a member of a local native dynasty should be eligible to the Polish throne in the future, entailing the permanent exclusion of any Habsburg candidates.

Sigismund saw a potential ally in Austria; he sought to establish a Catholic league that would actively engage in the Counter-Reformation. Zamoyski openly condemned Sigismund for associating with the Habsburgs, particularly Archduke Ernest, and speculated that Ernest was to be the potential successor if Sigismund abdicated and returned to Sweden. The anti-Austrian sentiment was only explicable as a circuitous attempt to traverse the Habsburg hegemony and influence in Central Europe, which Zamoyski perceived as a major threat. However, the parliament immediately rejected the proposal and ruled in favour of Austria, thus also accepting a marriage between Sigismund and Anne of Habsburg. Furthermore, the reestablishment of peaceful relations with Austria was dictated by the Treaty of Bytom and Będzin from March 1589 which was negotiated by Ippolito Aldobrandini, future Pope Clement VIII.

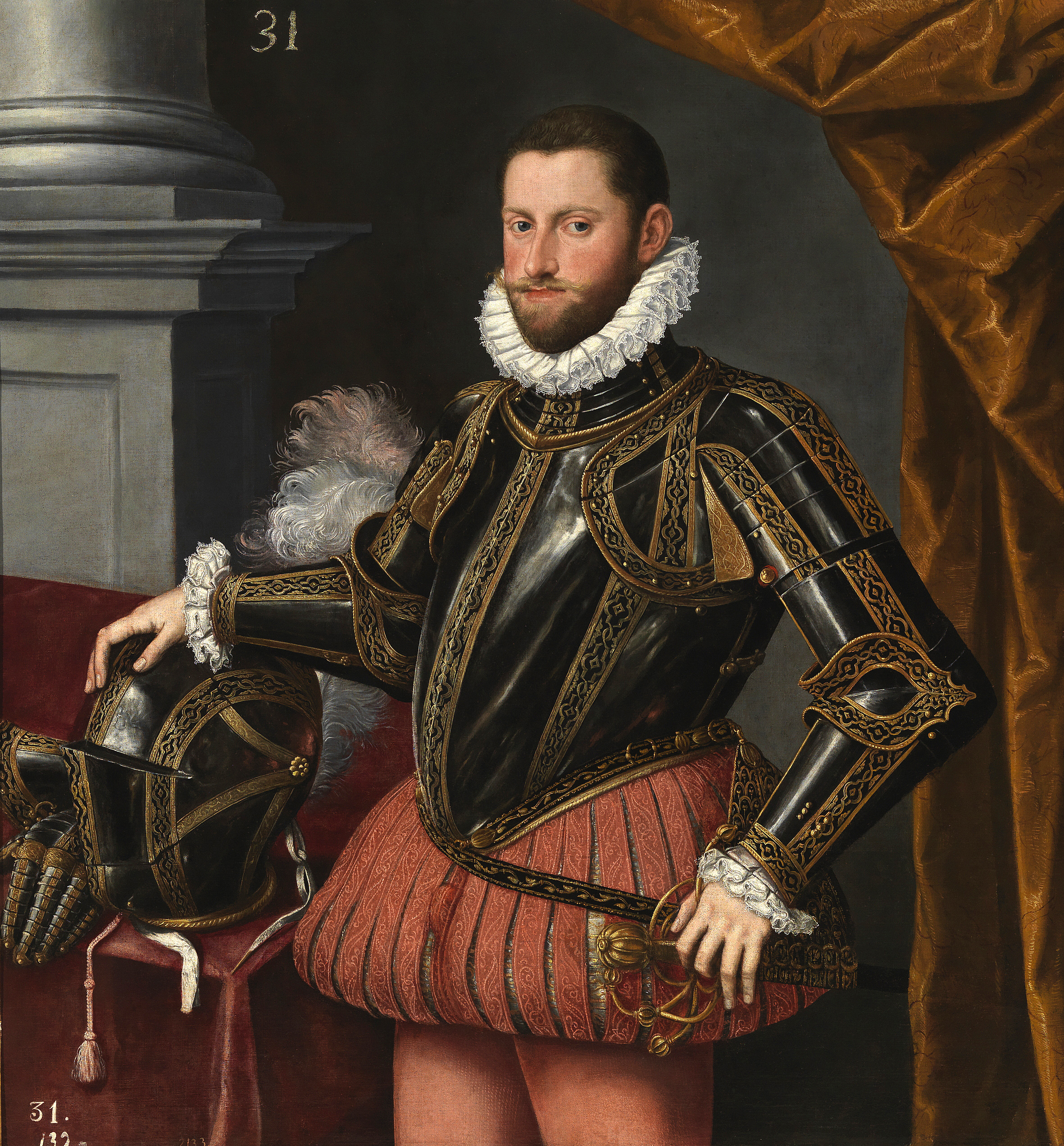
Archduke Ernest of Austria, whose correspondence with Sigismund caused a political crisis

At the subsequent Sejm session, assembled in March 1590, Zamoyski persuaded the gathered deputies and representatives to exclude Archduke Maximilian from future candidacy to the throne, describing the possibility of Austrian intrigues and the looming threat of the Turkish Empire. His opponents, headed by Primate Karnkowski, formed an informal confederation immediately after the Sejm rose to protest the decrees. All of the decrees of the first Sejm were rescinded by a second Sejm which sat at the end of the same year: the Hetmanship was suspended, the party of Maximilian was amnestied, the Zborowskis were rehabilitated, and Zamoyski's counterparts were removed from the royal court. Tensions between Sweden and Poland grew further over the ownership of Estonia following the dissolution of the Livonian Order; Zamoyski held Sigismund accountable for the dispute.

Sigismund's leniency towards the Habsburgs also alienated some clerics; the Austrians wanted to prevent Andrew Báthory from seizing the bishopric of Kraków and succeeded in doing so by diplomatic coaxing or coercion. The new papal nuncio, Annibale di Capua, a staunch Habsburg supporter, eventually convinced Sigismund to nominate Jerzy Radziwiłł after Piotr Myszkowski died on 5 April 1591. Capua stressed that Andrew had not been an ordained priest and was not legally capable of becoming a bishop. The decision strained the once friendly relations between Poland and Transylvania.

=== Peace settlement ===
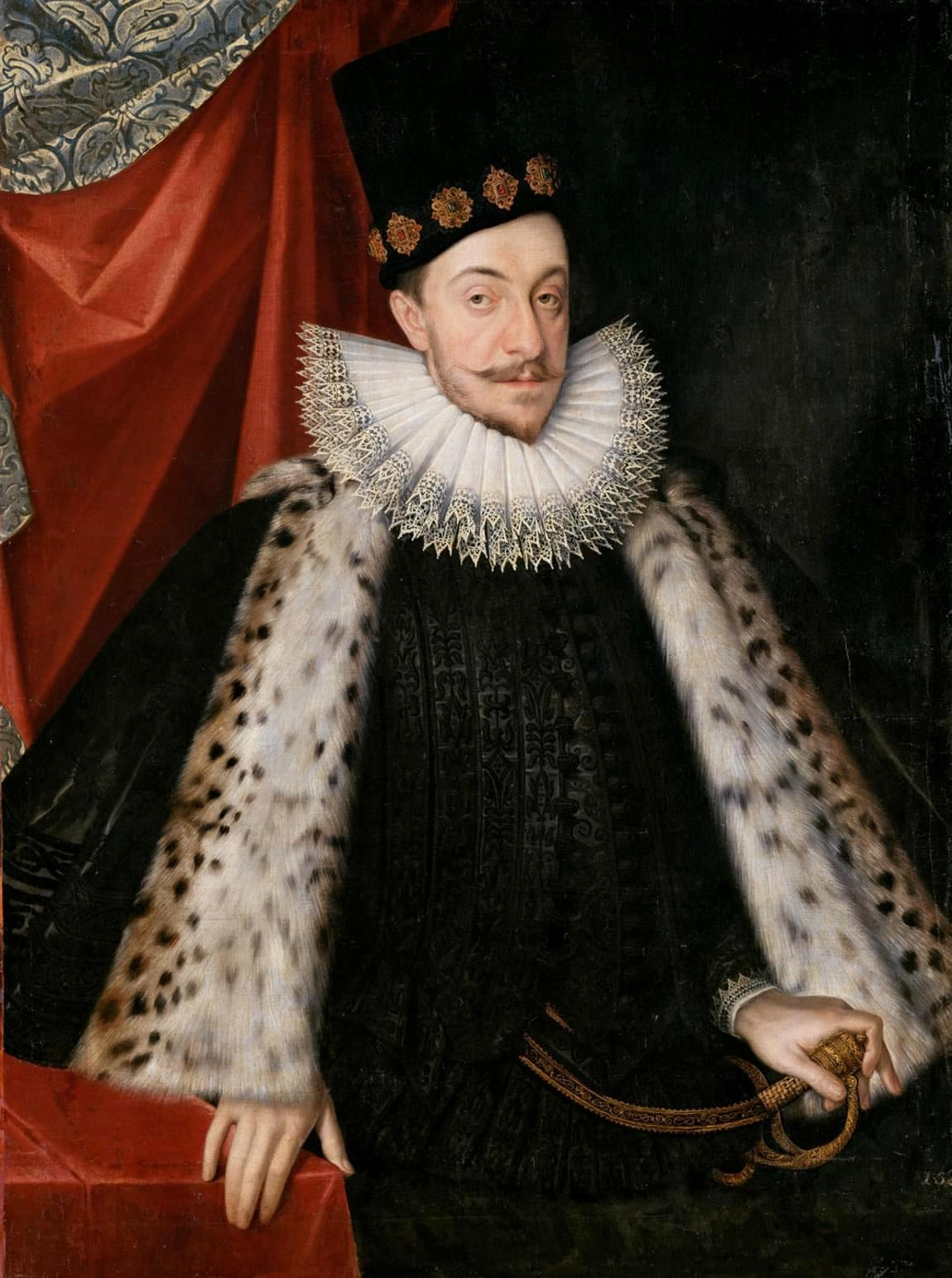
Sigismund early in his reign, by court painter Martin Kober

As outlined by Oskar Halecki, the king's friends were largely recruited from the higher clergy and the Jesuits, who violated the 1573 Warsaw Confederation guaranteeing religious freedoms in Poland and Lithuania. As persecution loomed, political dissidents grouped and formed factions which called for adherence to the laws of the Confederation. Zamoyski joined the dissidents, and, when Sigismund failed to prevent mob violence directed against non-Catholics in Vilnius and Kraków in 1591, he summoned several conventions that "demanded the guarantees of security". Sigismund yielded to their demands, however, he forbade any future conventions which could destabilize the state. The prohibition did not have a lasting effect, and gatherings of dissidents continued in the following year.

The opposition hoped to thwart the match with Archduchess Anne of Habsburg, whose state entry into Kraków at the end of May was greatly celebrated. Sigismund disregarded any protest regarding the marriage. Consequently, on 1 June 1592 Zamoyski formed another confederation at Jędrzejów (Latin: Andreiow) attended by the most eminent and distinguished magnates, among them Mikołaj Zebrzydowski and Stanisław Żółkiewski. At Andreiow, he allegedly exposed proof concerning a plot that would place Archduke Ernest on the throne if Sigismund was to abdicate. Zamoyski's claim caused an uproar.

On 7 September, Sigismund summoned the "Warsaw Inquisition Sejm" (sejm inkwizycyjny) to inquire into the so-called "Austrian cabals". Zamoyski's strong argument against that of the monarch was so persuasive that elderly Karnkowski sided with the Chancellor and his supporters, who abstained from kissing the King's hand upon arrival as the custom required. Alleged letters and private correspondence between Sigismund and Ernest with the royal signature was presented as evidence. The King rebuked these accusations; his aides attributed the falsified signature to the court scribe, who was subsequently imprisoned at Działdowo (Soldau), tortured, but pleaded not guilty. The opposition extended their demands and asked for the immediate removal of all foreign dignitaries from the court, including mercenaries, which was not fully enforced.

The Sejm had no definite outcome; most of the gathered nobles and diplomats dispersed as further incrimination of the sovereign proved futile and detrimental to the stability of the state. There is little evidence or written works from the period concerning the terms under which the Sejm functioned or how it concluded. Niemcewicz largely attributed the victory to Sigismund – the measures of the Counter-Reformation strengthened and within a year many of the convention's attendees died; acquiescent nobles favourable to the king were appointed as their successors, thus making his position less vulnerable. The rivalry between Sigismund and Zamoyski continued until the latter's death in 1605.

== War in Sweden ==
=== Tensions ===
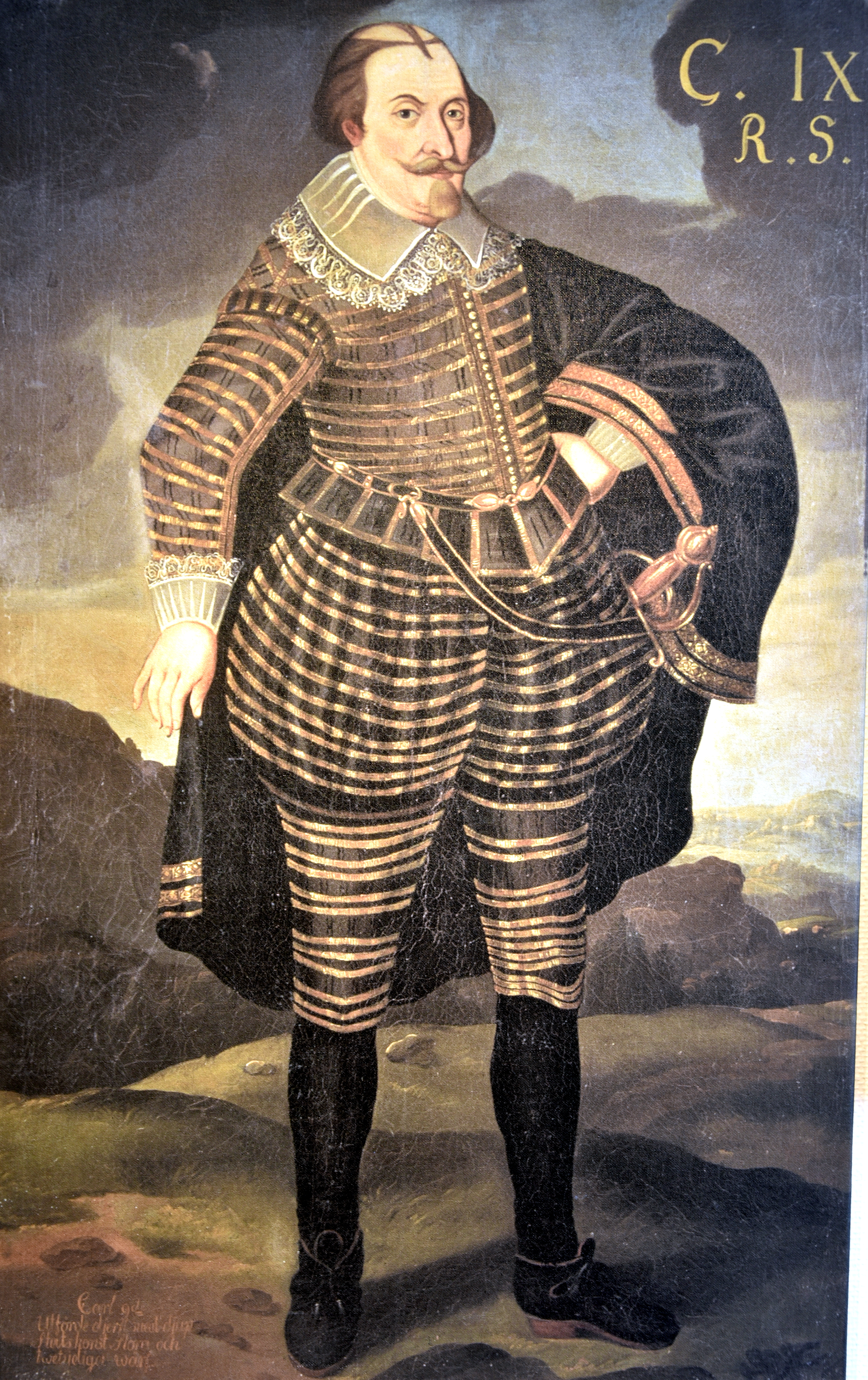
Charles of Sweden, Sigismund's uncle, who waged war against Sigismund and Poland for the Swedish crown

The Uppsala Resolution of 1594 dictated the rights and securities of Protestants in Sweden; it promised to uphold the Lutheran faith in the country, forbade non-Lutherans from being appointed to office or participating in the educational system and prevented Sigismund from freely raising taxes for war. However, the resolution was undermined whenever possible. With military backing, Sigismund installed his own commanders in Swedish castles and made them responsible directly to him. He established the office of regional governor (ståthållare) and appointed Charles' lifelong enemy, Klaus Fleming, as the overlord of Finland. The governors served notice that they would abstain from persecuting Catholicism in their administered territories. Erik Brahe, a Catholic, became the governor of Sweden's capital city, Stockholm, in defiance of the 1594 charter, which sparked widespread anger.

On 4 August 1594, Sigismund decreed that the Swedish parliament (Riksdag) had no right to function without royal consent. Despite this, Charles summoned a parliament at Söderköping in autumn of 1595, at which he declared himself regent and head of government, who would govern Sweden reciprocally with the Privy Council during the King's absence from the realm. The Finnish nobility, led by Fleming, rejected this resolution and so did Sigismund's emissary, who ordered him, in the name of the king, to resign. Fleming sympathised with Sigismund and considered Charles a rebel. In response, Charles instigated a brief revolt against Fleming among the peasants under Jaakko Ilkka in the province of Ostrobothnia, known today as the Cudgel War.

As outlined by historian Gary Dean Peterson, Fleming might have quelled the rebellion, but it was Charles who took advantage of the brutality of Fleming's men and started a successful propaganda war. The prospects of Polish and Catholic domination over Sweden became uncertain when Klaus Fleming died on 13 April 1597. He was succeeded by Arvid Stålarm the Younger, who did not accede to Swedish demands and awaited Charles' intervention in Finland. Meanwhile, the nobility dispersed; Erik Gustafsson Stenbock, Arvid Gustafsson Stenbock, Erik Sparre, Erik Brahe and Sten Banér fled to entreat Sigismund to return and counter Charles.

=== Civil war ===
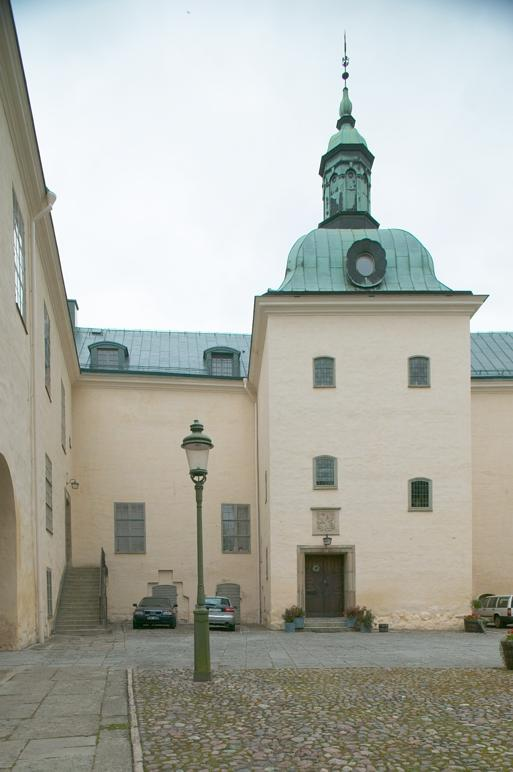
Linköping Castle, where Sigismund met with Charles to discuss the future of the Swedish monarchy

In 1597, a civil war erupted and Duke Charles was able to assume control over a large share of the powerful castles in Sweden, and in this manner achieved control over almost all the realm. However, Finland remained loyal to Sigismund and resisted. In September 1597, he sailed for the Finnish coast and seized Åbo Castle from Fleming's widow, Ebba Stenbock, by the end of the month. Charles's troops were not prepared nor strong enough to conquer or hold Finland in its entirety – they sailed back to Stockholm in October and Stålarm retook Åbo the same year.

As noted by envoys, several high-ranking noblemen fighting for Sigismund's cause were instantaneously sent to the scaffold. Further tensions and escalation of violence, as well as Charles's unpredictable stance, persuaded Sigismund to intervene. Christian IV of Denmark agreed to cooperate but would not join the armed conflict. The major seaports of Danzig (Gdańsk), Lübeck and Rostock were pressured to sever trade with Sweden. Polish privateers began to violently attack Swedish vessels in the Baltic. By February 1598 Sigismund assembled an army consisting of approximately 5,000 men. On 23 July 1598 the army left Danzig (Gdańsk) with eighty transports, several warships and exiled members of the Swedish parliament. Eight days later they landed in Kalmar, which surrendered without a fight.

After the fall of Kalmar, Charles found himself with major trouble on his hands; the army of the Polish Crown attracted Swedish followers, and Stockholm, lacking military defence, was easily taken with the help of the nobility and officers of Götaland. The cavalry of Uppland soon joined the royalists, and new forces were mobilised in Finland and Estonia. Charles' troops were greater in numbers, but mostly comprised poorly trained militias and peasants from the friendly provinces.

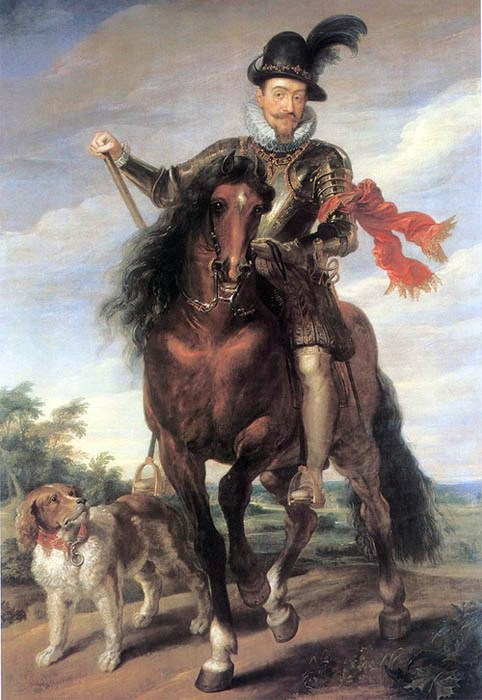
Equestrian portrait of King Sigismund by Peter Paul Rubens

Sigismund advanced his troops towards Stångebro in Linköping, where his sister Anna Vasa resided. On 8 September Charles executed a premature attack on Stångebro which was quickly repelled; his force was surrounded in the night and massacred by the Poles. Severed heads on lances and spikes startled Sigismund, who ordered an end to the violence. The supposed truce did not come into effect, and, on the morning of 25 September, the armies clashed once more in a major engagement at the Battle of Stångebro. The prevailing fog was instrumental in hiding troop movement; the Swedish rebels used the opportunity to take the bridges on the river Stångån when Sigismund's men were falsely led into a truce and retreated to their camp. Their attempt to regroup and form a second defensive line proved futile and Charles emerged victorious as the Polish army was also cut off from supplies by superior Swedish warships.

=== Aftermath and deposition ===
The peace agreement was sealed with a dinner at Linköping Castle on 28 September. Both sides agreed to lay down arms and send the troops back to their home provinces, except for the King's personal guard. Charles' appointments were to be recognised, and a parliament was to be called to settle any disputes. The King, who was under pressure, fearing for his life without his army and having realised that he had lost the political battle, fled with his sister to Poland during the coming days. At the same time as the peace treaty was being signed in Linköping, conflicts were taking place in Dalarna. There, a pro-Sigismund bailiff, Jacob Näf, had tried to raise up the Dalecarlians against Duke Charles. Chaos ensued, Näf was executed, and the Dalecarlians set out on a campaign in 1598, burning and killing down to Brunnbäck ferry. In Västergötland, Carl Carlsson Gyllenhielm, illegitimate son of Duke Charles, defeated the rebellion. A number of Swedes who had sided with Sigismund, including his council supporters, were handed over to Charles as part of the peace settlement. They were later killed in the Linköping Bloodbath of 1600.

Sigismund was officially deposed from the throne of Sweden by a Riksdag held in Stockholm on 24 July 1599. He was given six (or twelve depending on source) months to send his son, Prince Władysław IV Vasa, to Sweden as his successor, under the condition that the boy would be brought up in the Protestant faith. In February 1600, Duke Charles summoned the Estates of the Realm to Linköping. Since Sigismund had not provided a reply, the Estates elected Duke Charles as King apparent; he would not become Charles IX until his coronation four years later. During the winter and spring of 1600, Charles also occupied the Swedish part of Estonia, as the castle commanders had shown sympathies towards Sigismund.

== Polish affairs ==
=== Clash with England (1597) ===
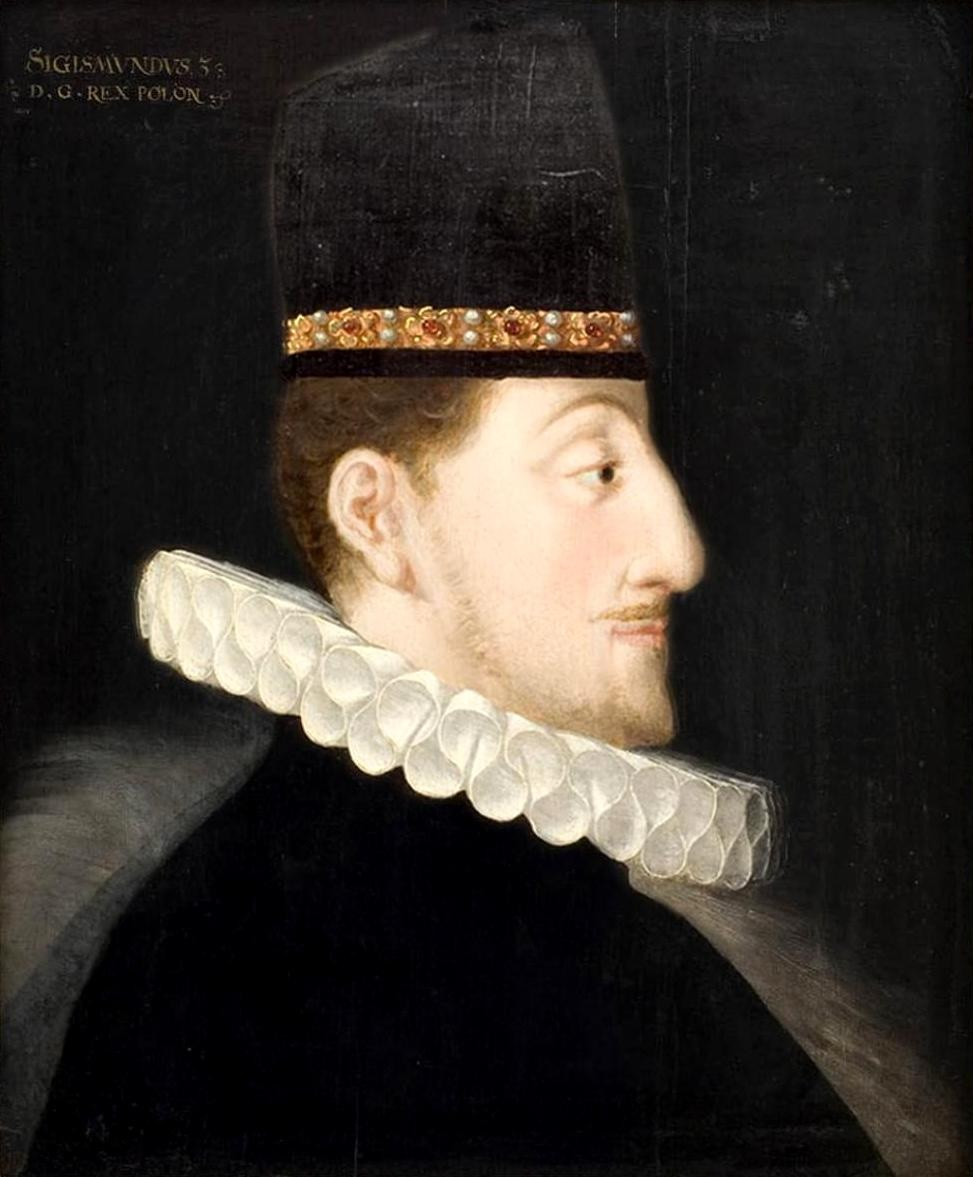
Portrait of Sigismund as a young adult by Jan Szwankowski, c. 1590

In the 1590s, the interests of the English and the Ottoman Turks coincided in opposing the Spanish; on the other hand, Sigismund had clashed with the Turks in Poland's southeast. In the Low Countries of northwestern Europe, Protestant forces sent by Elizabeth I fought the Catholic armies of Spain's Philip II Habsburg, preventing Spain from capturing territory on the south side of the English Channel. England's naval power also prevented Spain from completely dominating the Mediterranean, to the benefit of the Turks. During this time, England purchased a great deal of grain and timber from Poland to supply its navy, necessitating good relations with Poland. Edward Barton, Elizabeth's ambassador to the Ottoman Empire, had warned them that England would have to respond if the Ottomans invaded Poland.

In July 1597, the Queen's Privy Council instructed Henry Billingsley, Lord Mayor of London, to arrange housing for a Polish diplomat and report back to the council. On 23 July, Paweł Działyński (Note: Recorded as Paul Dzialynski or Paul De Jaline in English historiography) arrived in London and was accommodated at the house of Sir John Spencer. On 25 July, Działyński was granted an audience with Elizabeth and her court at the palace in Greenwich. As described by Robert Cecil, 1st Earl of Salisbury, the ambassador out of Poland at first seemed to be "a gentleman of excellent fashion, wit, discourse, language, and person." He presented his credentials, kissed the Queen's hand, then walked to the centre of the chamber and, as outlined by Cecil, "began his oration aloud in Latin, with such a gallant countenance as in my life I never beheld."

Działyński informed Elizabeth that Sigismund was outraged that her vessels were capturing the ships of Polish and Hanseatic merchants trading with the Spanish, and indicated that Sigismund was prepared to commence hostilities over the matter unless Elizabeth immediately rescinded this policy and returned captured ships and cargo.

Elizabeth rose "lionlike" and rebuked Działyński, comparing his speech to a declaration of war and manners to those of "a herald rather than an ambassador." She reminded him that England was instrumental in halting the Turkish advances and added, "I can hardly believe that if the King [Sigismund] himself were present he would have used such language." Sigismund emerged successful in securing (non-military, non-food) trade with the Spanish Crown, though the relations between the two nations became strained.

=== Zebrzydowski rebellion (1606) ===
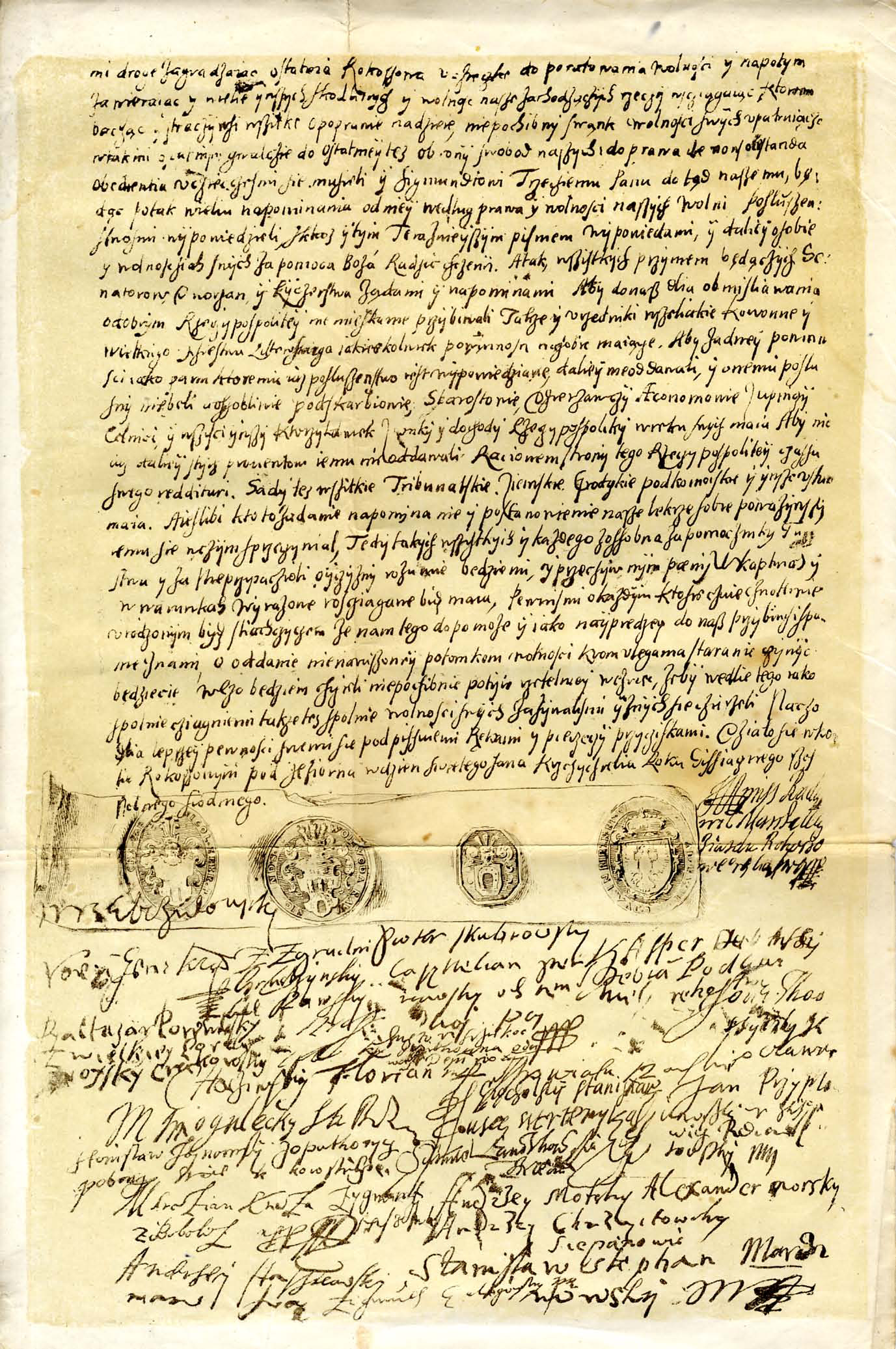
Dethronisation act issued on 24 June 1607.

Sigismund's attempt to grasp unlimited authority resulted in the Zebrzydowski rebellion, an armed insurrection formed in 1606 by Hetman Mikołaj Zebrzydowski, Jan Szczęsny Herburt, Stanisław Stadnicki, Aleksander Józef Lisowski and Prince Janusz Radziwiłł in Stężyca and Lublin. It was primarily caused by the growing dissatisfaction with the monarch among the Polish szlachta and wealthy magnates. The rebels disapproved of Sigismund's efforts to weaken the diplomatic and political capabilities of the nobility and to introduce an absolute monarchy.

The participants of the rebellion formed a war council and outlined their demands in 67 articles. They demanded the dethronement of Sigismund for breaching the Henrician Articles and stipulated the expulsion of Jesuits from the Polish–Lithuanian Commonwealth. The Sejm was to be granted the authority of appointing state officials instead of the King, local officials were to be elected and the rights of Protestants expanded. The 1607 Parliament rejected these conditions. Meanwhile, the nobles mobilised in the village of Guzów. In 1607 the Polish Royal Army, led by Hetman Jan Karol Chodkiewicz, was sent to pacify the rebels. A full-scale battle ensued on 5 July, with 200 casualties, which resulted in the victory of the Royalist forces.

The rebellious nobles formally surrendered to the King at the 1609 meeting of the parliament, which became known as the Pacification Sejm. In return for their surrender, the rebels were granted leniency. Many royal supporters, including Hetman Chodkiewicz, had exacted amnesty for the rebels. Despite the failure to overthrow Sigismund, the rebellion firmly established the rights and privileges of nobles in the Polish political system, confirmed the inviolability of the royal elections and religious tolerance.

=== Sigismund's invasion of Russia (1609–1618) ===
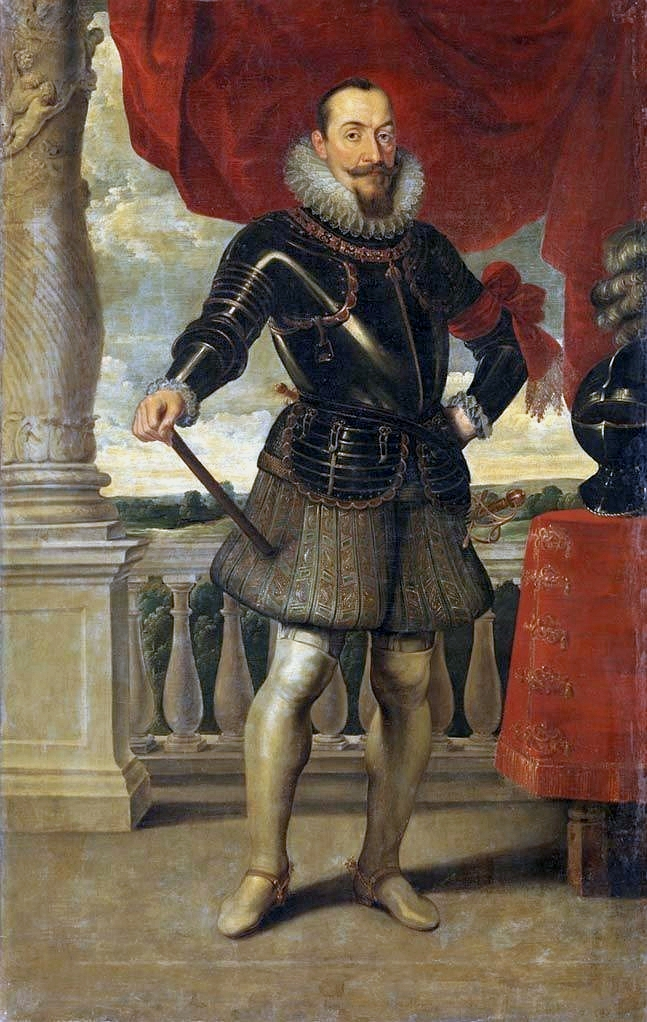
Sigismund as supreme commander of Poland–Lithuania, dressed in hose

Sigismund's major goals were achieving stability of government, combating Protestantism, and expanding Poland's territory. While the Russians were embroiled in a civil war known as the Time of Troubles, stoked by some Polish nobles through the Dimitriads, Sigismund saw an opportunity to invade Russia and take power. Sweden also became involved, but never made a firm alliance with any one side.

==== Background ====
The death of Feodor I of Russia in 1598 caused internal instability and a succession crisis upon the extinction of the Rurik dynasty. Further setbacks that contributed to the escalation of violence were the famine of 1601–1603, which killed two million Russians, around a third of the population. The new Tsar, Boris Godunov, proved to be an ineffective ruler and died after suffering a brain haemorrhage in April 1605. He left one son, Feodor II, who succeeded him and ruled for only a few months, until he and Godunov's widow were murdered under mysterious circumstances in June 1605, possibly on Sigismund's orders. Simultaneously, various impostors and pretenders to the Russian throne appeared claiming to be Dmitry Ivanovich, the youngest son of Ivan the Terrible, who in fact died in 1591. After the fall of Sigismund's candidates – False Dmitry I and his Polish wife Marina Mniszech (nicknamed "Marinka the Witch" by the Russians) – Vasili Ivanovich Shuysky was crowned as Vasili IV.

The death of False Dmitry and widespread chaos proved a reason for Poland to prepare an invasion. Prior raids between 1605 and 1609 were conducted by Polish nobles or adventurers along with hired cossacks and foreign mercenaries. Sigismund's primary intention was to destroy the Russian state and impose Catholicism with the use of force or terror if necessary. Lew Sapieha, Grand Chancellor of Lithuania, sought neutrality by proposing to Boris Godunov an "eternal" peace treaty between Russia and Poland–Lithuania, but the idea did not gain support and was declined.

==== Campaign ====
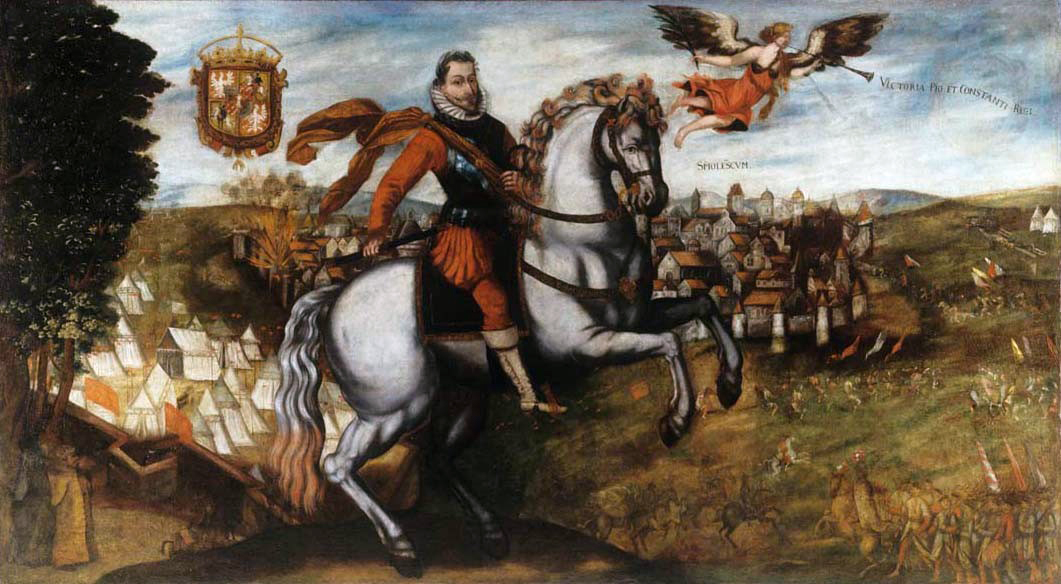
Victorious Sigismund at Smolensk, by Italian-born artist Tommaso Dolabella, 1611

The Commonwealth army under the command of Hetman Stanisław Żółkiewski crossed the border and on 29 September 1609 laid siege to Smolensk. On 4 July 1610, at the Battle of Klushino, the outnumbered Polish force achieved a decisive victory over the combined Russian and Swedish force, mostly due to the tactical competence of the Polish winged hussars. The battle was a major blow to the Russians; Tsar Vasili IV was subsequently ousted by the Seven Boyars, and Żółkiewski entered Moscow, beginning the two-year tyrannical occupation of the Kremlin. The Seven Boyars proclaimed Polish prince Władysław IV, Sigismund's son, as the new Tsar of all Russia. In June 1611 Smolensk fell to the Poles; the deposed Vasili Shuysky was transported in a caged wagon to Warsaw, where he paid tribute to Sigismund and the Senate at the Royal Castle on 29 October 1611. He eventually died in captivity at Gostynin; he was most likely poisoned, as his brother died soon after. The Polish army also committed countless atrocities while stationed in Moscow.

In 1611, Kuzma Minin and Dmitry Pozharsky formed a new army to launch an uprising against the Polish occupiers. The Poles eventually withdrew from Moscow in September 1612 after pillaging and burning the city. When news reached Sigismund he hurried with a relief force, but was unable to commence an attack. The war continued with little military action until 1618 when the Truce of Deulino was signed, which granted Poland new territories, including the city of Smolensk. The agreement marked the greatest geographical expansion of the Polish–Lithuanian Commonwealth until the loss of Livonia in 1629. However, Russia was able to retain independence and Michael Romanov was crowned Tsar in 1613. This established the Romanov dynasty which ruled Russia until the February Revolution in 1917. Sigismund's personal ambition of ruling the vast lands in the east as well as converting their populace to Catholicism ended in a fiasco. According to Alexander Gillespie, approximately five million Russians died between 1598 and 1613, the result of continuous conflict, civil war, instigated famine and Sigismund's politics.

=== Thirty Years' War (1618–1648) ===
Sigismund sought to join the Catholic side of the Thirty Years' War, but was denied by the Polish parliament. British historian Robert Nisbet Bain wrote that his plan was to invade and possibly occupy Transylvania, then an Ottoman ally and therefore considered dangerous to the Habsburg monarchy and Poland. The Rákóczis and Gabriel Bethlen were sympathetic with the Sultan and would counterattack if the opportunity arose.

Bain further highlighted that the chief pillars of military strength in Poland, including Stanisław Żółkiewski, warmly approved of the King's policy in this respect, but it proved to be impracticable. The parliament's non-interventionist stance went so far that it refused to grant any subsidies for the Swedish Wars. The indecision and political opposition weakened the alliance between the Habsburg states and the Commonwealth. Polish mercenaries did, however, join the Holy Roman Empire in combat at the Battle of Humenné against Transylvania.

=== Polish–Ottoman War (1620–1621) ===
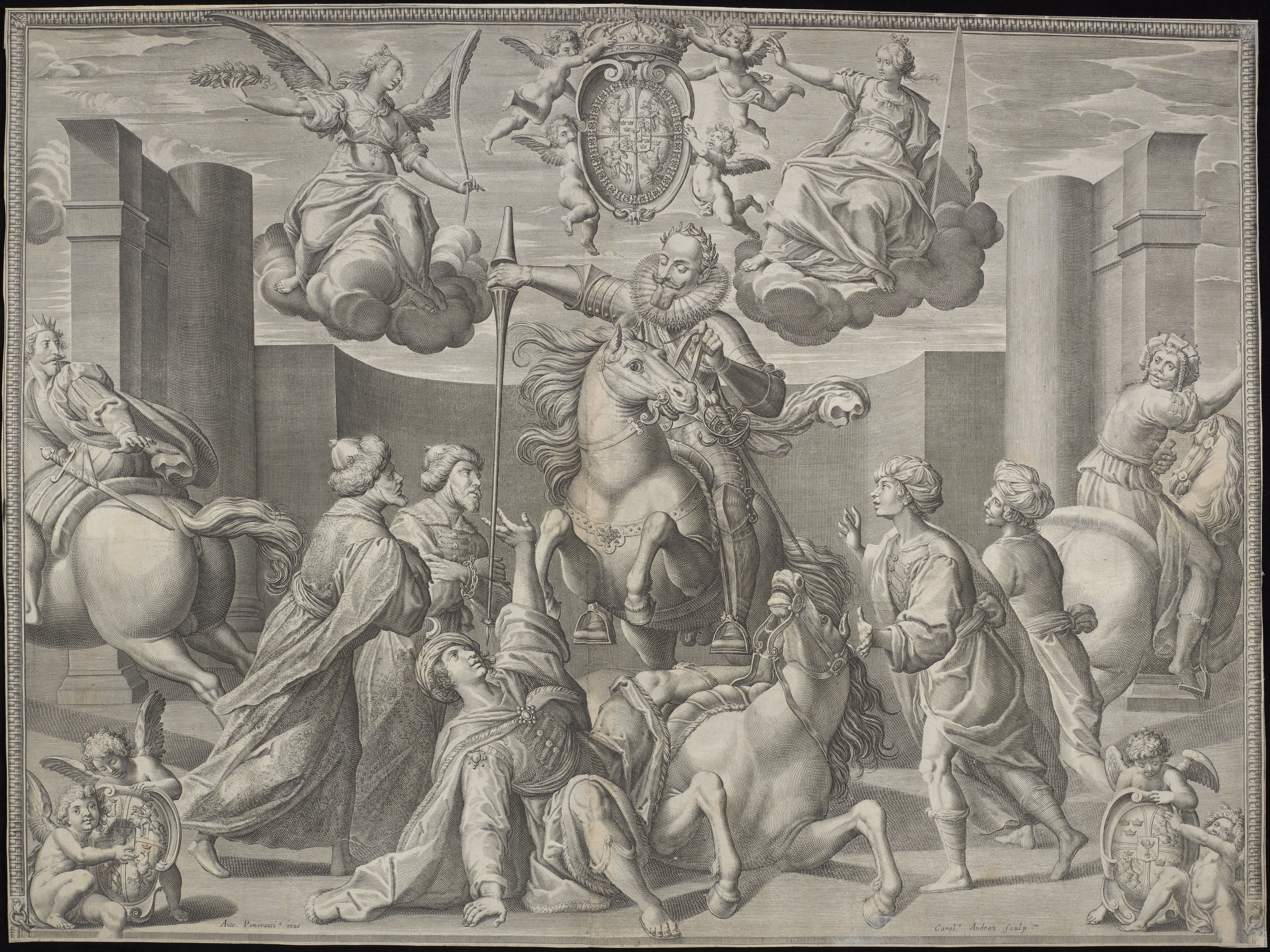
Apotheosis of Sigismund following his victory over the Ottoman Empire, etching from 1629. The King's spear striking a Turk symbolises the triumph of Catholicism and Christianity over Islam.

The Principality of Moldavia was a Polish fief since the Middle Ages, and Sigismund aimed at securing that despite the growing threat from the south. With the Ottoman influence on the rise, the Sultan aimed at expanding the Ottoman Empire westward. The Ottoman–Habsburg wars, which lasted almost two centuries, were also a sign of the Sultan's desire to rule mainland Europe. Voivode Gaspar Graziani, ruler of Moldavia, decided to switch sides in favour of Poland and rebelled against the Turks. In turn, Sigismund sent an army to aid Graziani, a move which sparked the Polish–Ottoman War.

In 1620, the Polish forces were defeated at Cecora and Hetman Żółkiewski perished during the battle. In 1621 a strong army of Ottomans, led by Osman II, advanced from Edirne towards the Polish frontier. Approximately 160,000 men besieged the Khotyn Fortress in September 1621, but were defeated at the Battle of Khotyn by a Polish garrison counting no more than 50,000 soldiers. During the siege Hetman Jan Karol Chodkiewicz died of exhaustion and illness in the camp.

The Treaty of Khotyn was signed on 9 October 1621, which resulted in no territorial gain or loss, but Sigismund was to relinquish his claims on Moldavia and the Ottoman Empire was prevented from marching into Poland. Sultan Osman himself was not fully satisfied with the war's outcome and blamed the defiant janissaries. His wish and plans to modernize the army, which was blamed for the defeat, were however opposed by the traditionalist janissary units. That opposition resulted in the 1622 rebellion in which Osman II was deposed and strangled.

=== Polish–Swedish War (1626–1629) ===
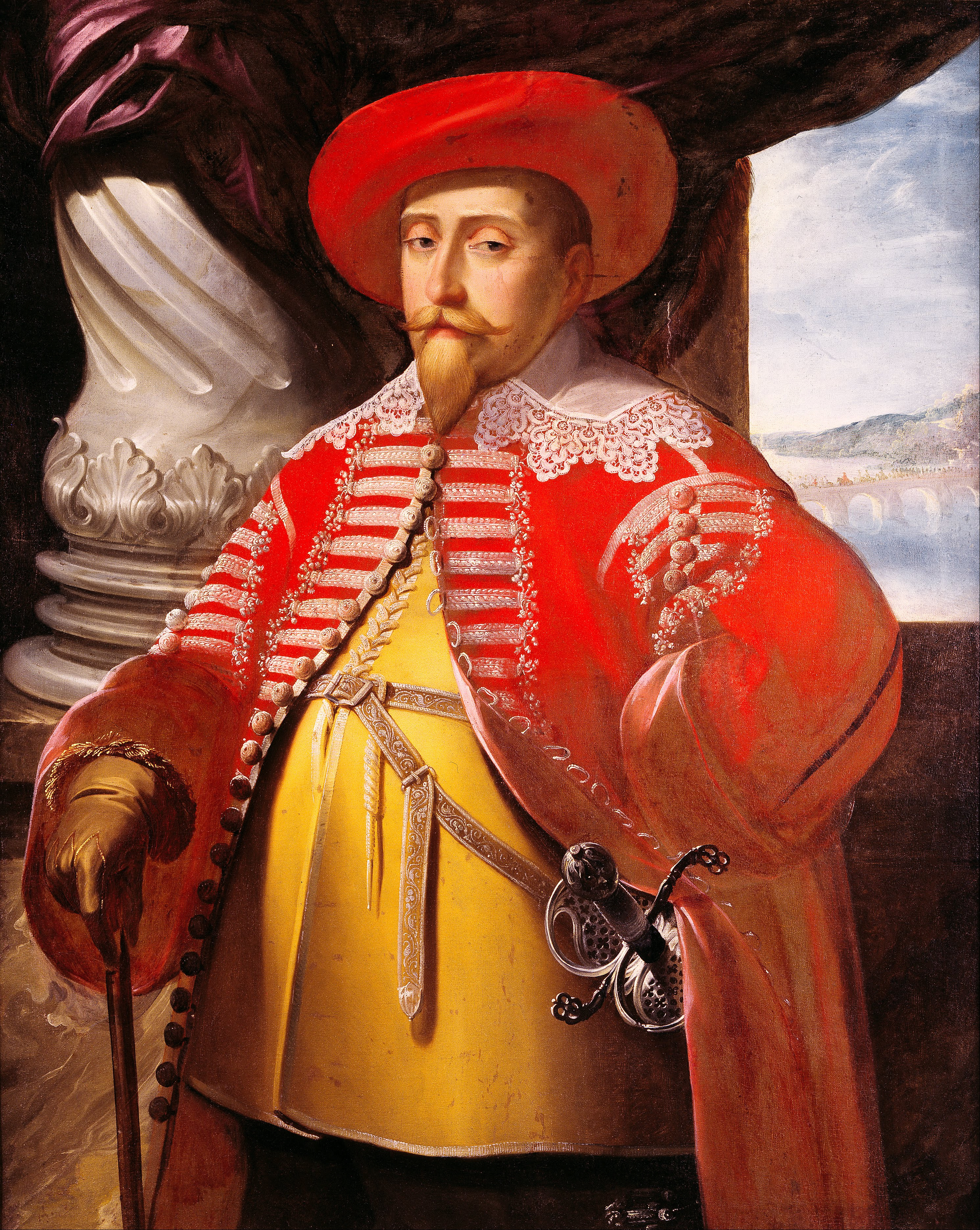
Gustavus Adolphus of Sweden in a Polish costume, 1631–1632. A cousin and lifelong enemy of Sigismund, he attempted to take Ducal Prussia and Livonia.

Following a series of conflicts between Poland and Sweden in 1600–1611, 1617–1618, and 1621–1625, all of which ended in a stalemate, Gustavus Adolphus invaded in 1626 to gain control over Livonia and relinquish Sigismund's claim to the Swedish crown. Sigismund, already in advanced age, continued his long-term ambition to seize Sweden, which gave Gustavus Adolphus a reasonable casus belli and justification for war. Though the Polish army achieved major victories in the previous battles against Sweden, particularly at Kircholm in 1605, the very end proved to be catastrophic.

The first skirmish took place in January 1626 near Wallhof, in present-day Latvia, where the Swedish army of 4,900 men ambushed a Polish force of 2,000 men commanded by Jan Stanisław Sapieha, son of Lew Sapieha. Polish casualties were estimated at between 500 and 1,000 dead, wounded and captured. According to historians, the Polish-Lithuanian commander later suffered a nervous breakdown.

In May 1626, the Swedes entered Polish Ducal Prussia. Escorted by a fleet, a second Swedish army disembarked in July near the town of Piława (Pillau). The landings were a complete surprise to the Commonwealth's defences, and despite a relatively small Swedish force, Gustavus Adolphus quickly captured the coastal towns and cities, almost without a fight. Many of these were inhabited by Protestants who resisted the staunchly Catholic Sigismund and Polish domination of their lands; some towns opened their gates to the Protestant Swedish forces, whom they portrayed as liberators. However, fortified Gdańsk (Danzig), which maintained its own standing army and a sizeable fleet, refused to surrender. Simultaneously, Sigismund received little to no support from his vassal George William of Brandenburg-Prussia, who, as a Calvinist, pledged neutrality in the conflict. Jędrzej Moraczewski described George's neutral stance to salvage his dukedom as "comical".

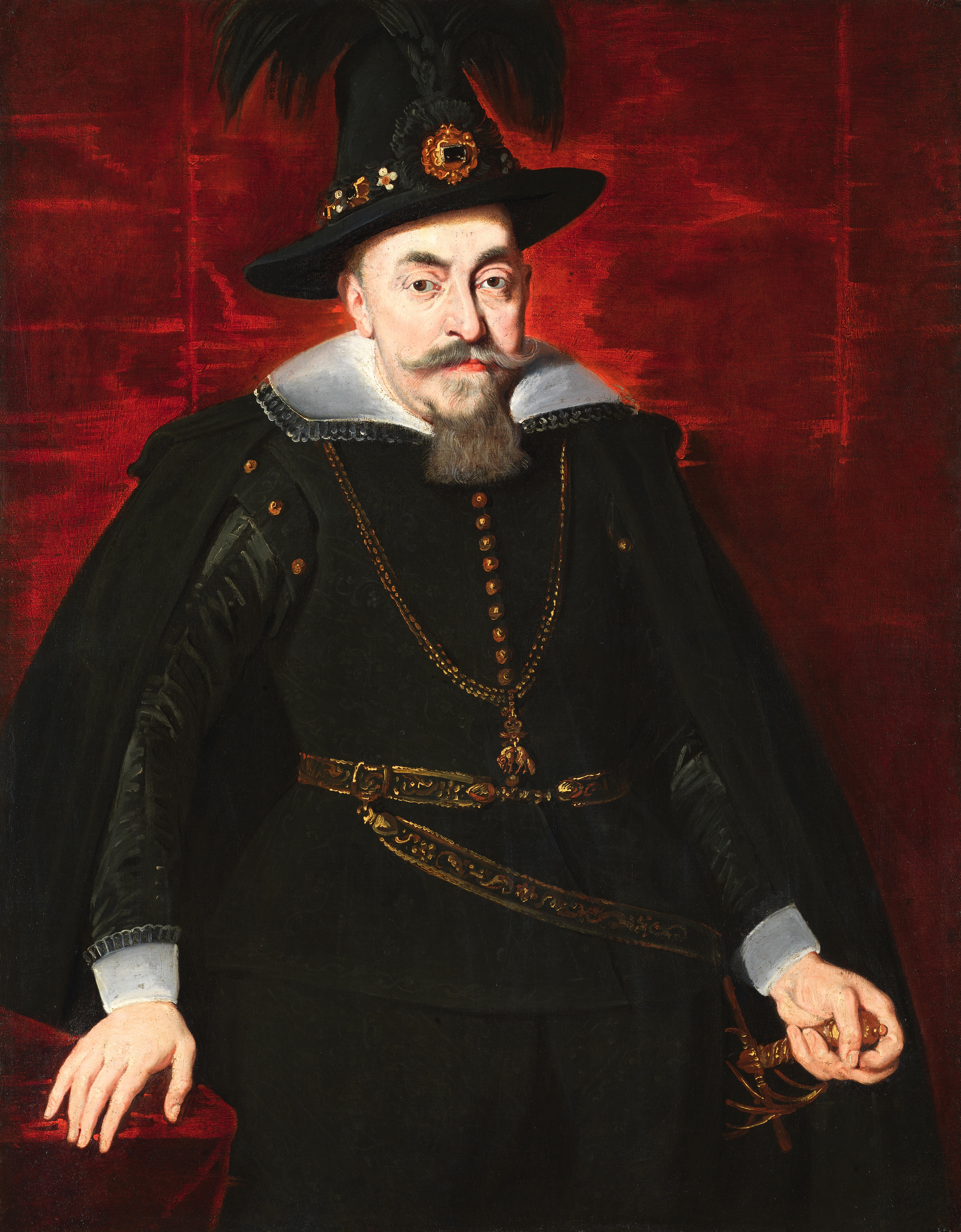
Portrait by Peter Paul Rubens, c. 1620s

The Poles attempted to divert the Swedes from Gdańsk by deploying an army to fight at Gniew. The fighting continued for several days until 1 October, when Sigismund ordered the withdrawal of his troops and called on reinforcements from around the country. The battle, despite a tactical victory for Sweden, was a strategic blow to Gustavus, who was subsequently unable to besiege Gdańsk. At Dirschau, in the summer of 1627, Gustavus Adolphus was seriously wounded and the Prussian campaign came to a halt. The wound forced the king to stay in bed until autumn, and his right arm was weakened with some fingers partially paralysed. As the major trade ports on the coast of the Baltic Sea were blocked by Swedish vessels, Sigismund sent a small squadron of ten ships under Arend Dickmann to engage the Swedes at the Battle of Oliva. It was the largest naval battle fought by the Polish–Lithuanian Commonwealth Navy, which successfully defeated the enemy fleet and broke the Swedish blockade.

Although Poland emerged victorious in the final battle at Trzciana, Sigismund's exhausted camp accepted a peace offer. The Truce of Altmark signed on 26 September 1629 (16 September O.S.) granted Sweden the control of Livonia, though Prussia, Latgale and Dyneburg remained under Polish governance.

=== Other ===
Sigismund III vested several localities with town rights, including Bogoria, Wiskitki, Nowogród, Dunajowce, Lida, Biała Cerkiew, Chwastów, Lubcz, Virbalis, Lazdijai and Simnas.

== Assassination attempt ==
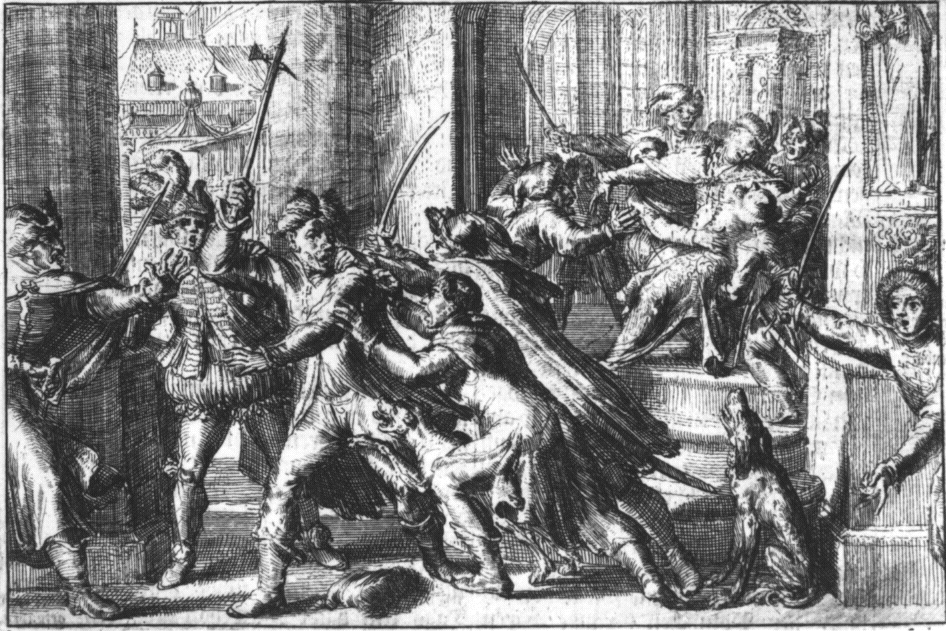
Assassination attempt on Sigismund by Michał Piekarski in 1620.

An unsuccessful attempt on the life of the King was made on 15 November 1620. It occurred on Sunday morning when the monarch and his entourage were to attend mass at St. John's Church in Warsaw.

Sigismund was to arrive by crossing the alley or passage that linked the Royal Castle with the temple. As the royal procession drew closer to the church door, hidden in a nearby portal was a petty nobleman Michał Piekarski, armed with a war axe. When the monarch reached the final steps, Piekarski leapt out and threw himself on the King, stabbing him twice, firstly in the back and then in the cheek, and striking him in the arm. However, he was not able to deliver a fatal blow due to the intervention of royal guardsmen as well as Court Marshal Łukasz Opaliński, who shielded the King. Concurrently, Prince Ladislaus wounded the assassin on the head with a sabre. Other accounts state that no guards were present; the cortege had a casual character and the assassin was most likely overpowered by the attendees.

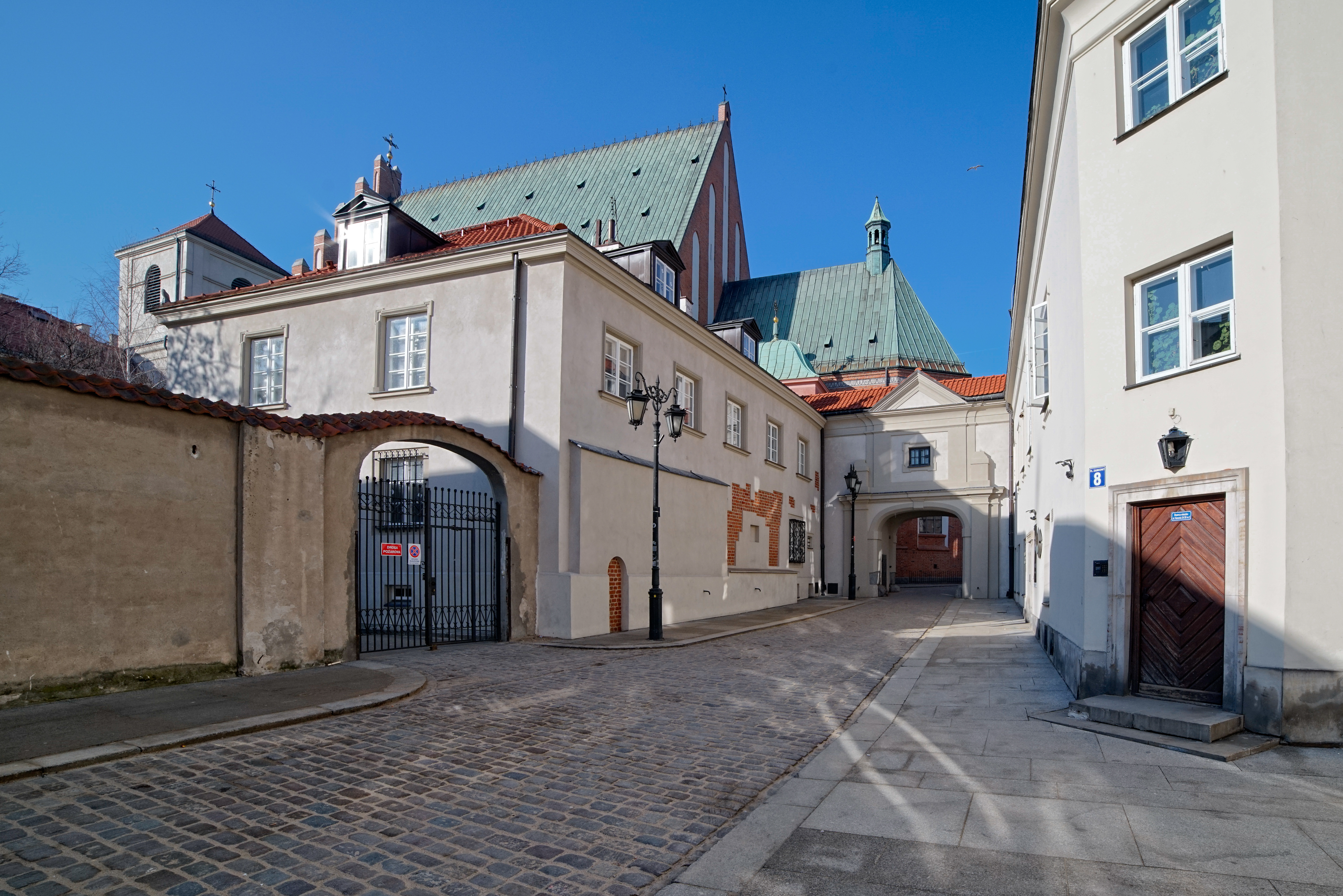
The gateway between the Warsaw Castle and St. John's Cathedral was constructed as a precaution after the assassination attempt.

Parishioners gathered around the pale and lifeless King, who collapsed to the ground after the incident. The guards and other attendants, among them Marcin Szyszkowski, were able to revive him and after a medical examination, the wounds were found to be non-life-threatening. Chaos erupted when false rumours spread that the King had been murdered as his clothes were stained in blood. Initially, the townsfolk believed that the city was being attacked; the confusion arose when an Italian priest's cry traditore! (traitor) was misinterpreted as "Tatar".

The assassin was widely regarded as a mentally unstable melancholic, unrestrained in deeds. Piekarski's most probable cause for the assassination was fame and recognition; the successful assassination of Henry IV in Paris (1610) by François Ravaillac served as motivation for his actions. For the appropriate moment Piekarski waited patiently ten years. At his trial, he did not deny the crime he committed and heavily insulted the monarch, whilst blaming himself for the failed regicide. Piekarski was executed in a similar manner as Ravaillac on 27 November 1620 in Warsaw; he was publicly humiliated, tortured, and his body torn apart by horses. The dismembered remains were subsequently burned and their ashes scattered by a cannon.

== Religion ==
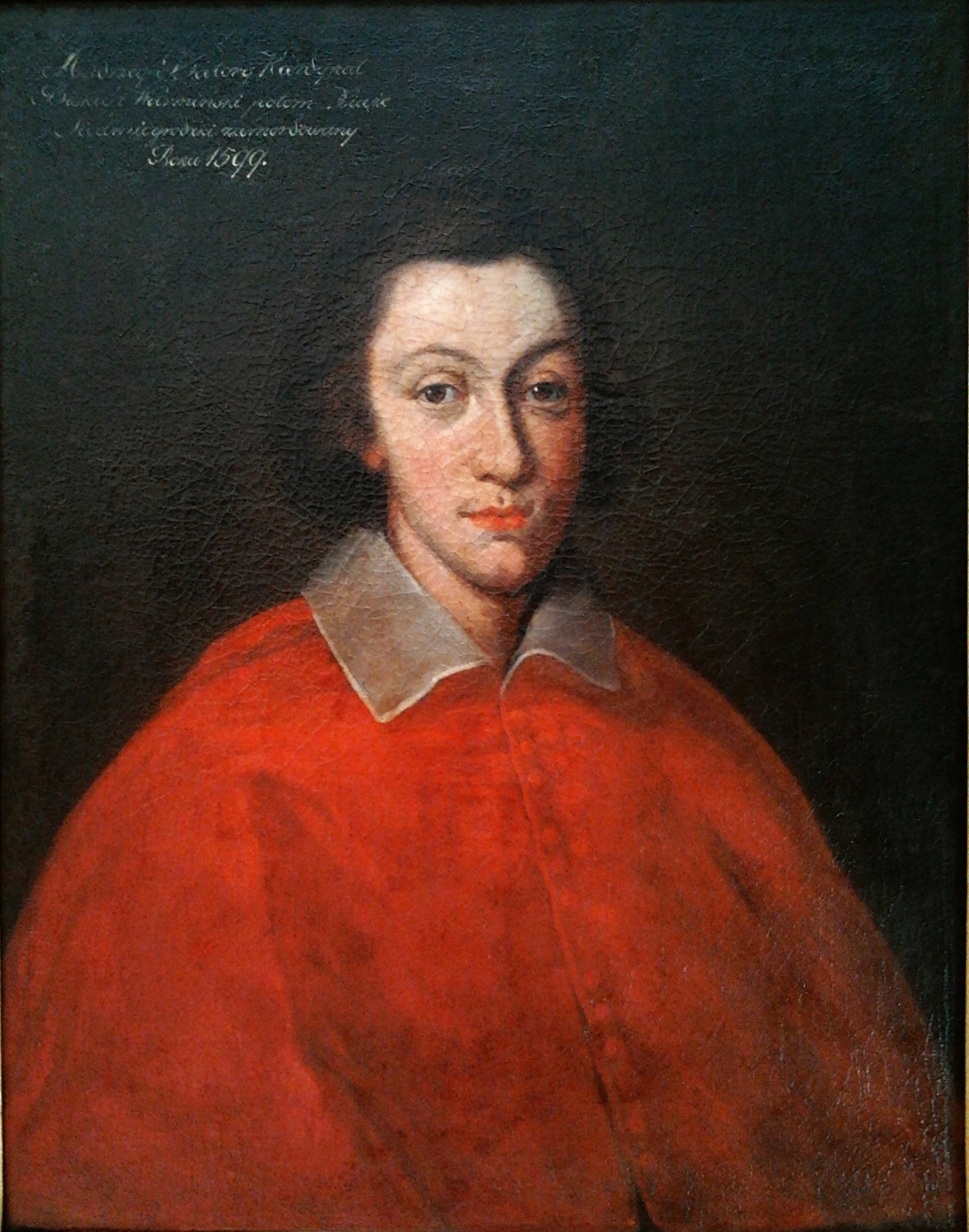
John Albert was appointed bishop at the age of nine and cardinal at the age of twenty thanks to his father's reputation.

The reign of Sigismund marked the beginning of the Counter-Reformation and the downfall of Protestantism in Poland–Lithuania. His hate towards Protestants, coupled with the advice of Jesuit priests, led to repressions and the eventual demise of the Polish Brethren decades later; their expulsion from Poland in 1658 contributed to the spread of Unitarianism across the globe. The Polish Reformed Church, once a thriving institution and community, began to fall. Akin actions were undertaken against other minorities in the country. Sigismund's contempt for Eastern Orthodoxy was equally strong; it was his initiative that the native Ruthenian peoples inhabiting the eastern lands of the Commonwealth be forcibly converted to Catholicism, which laid the foundation for the modern Ukrainian Greek Catholic Church. However, in Sweden the policies had an adverse effect; the Reformation in Northern Europe continued and anti-Catholic sentiment strengthened.

The discrimination further extended to Jews and Muslims (Tatars), whose rights were already restricted. The Warsaw Confederation of 1573 had granted religious freedoms, but the degree to which this was implemented often varied. In 1588, Sigismund banned Jews and Tatars from holding public office or assuming political roles. Daily contact with Christians was to be limited and any attempts made at converting Christians to Judaism or Islam were punishable by death. Insubordinates were burned at the stake, or, in the case of Muslims and Christians who married, beheaded. Circumcision of Christian children by Jews was made a capital offence. However, trade practices continued to thrive and Poland remained a safe haven for refugees fleeing oppression in other parts of the continent, chiefly during the Thirty Years' War.

Nepotism under Sigismund and in the years following his death was undoubtedly apparent – three of his sons, John Casimir, John Albert and Charles Ferdinand, were ordained as priests and held notable posts. Charles was appointed bishop of Wrocław in 1625 and bishop of Płock in 1640. John Albert became bishop of Warmia at the age of nine in 1621 and cardinal-bishop of Kraków at the age of twenty in 1632. John Casimir, prior to his election to the throne, was made a cardinal at the behest of Pope Innocent X.

== Death ==
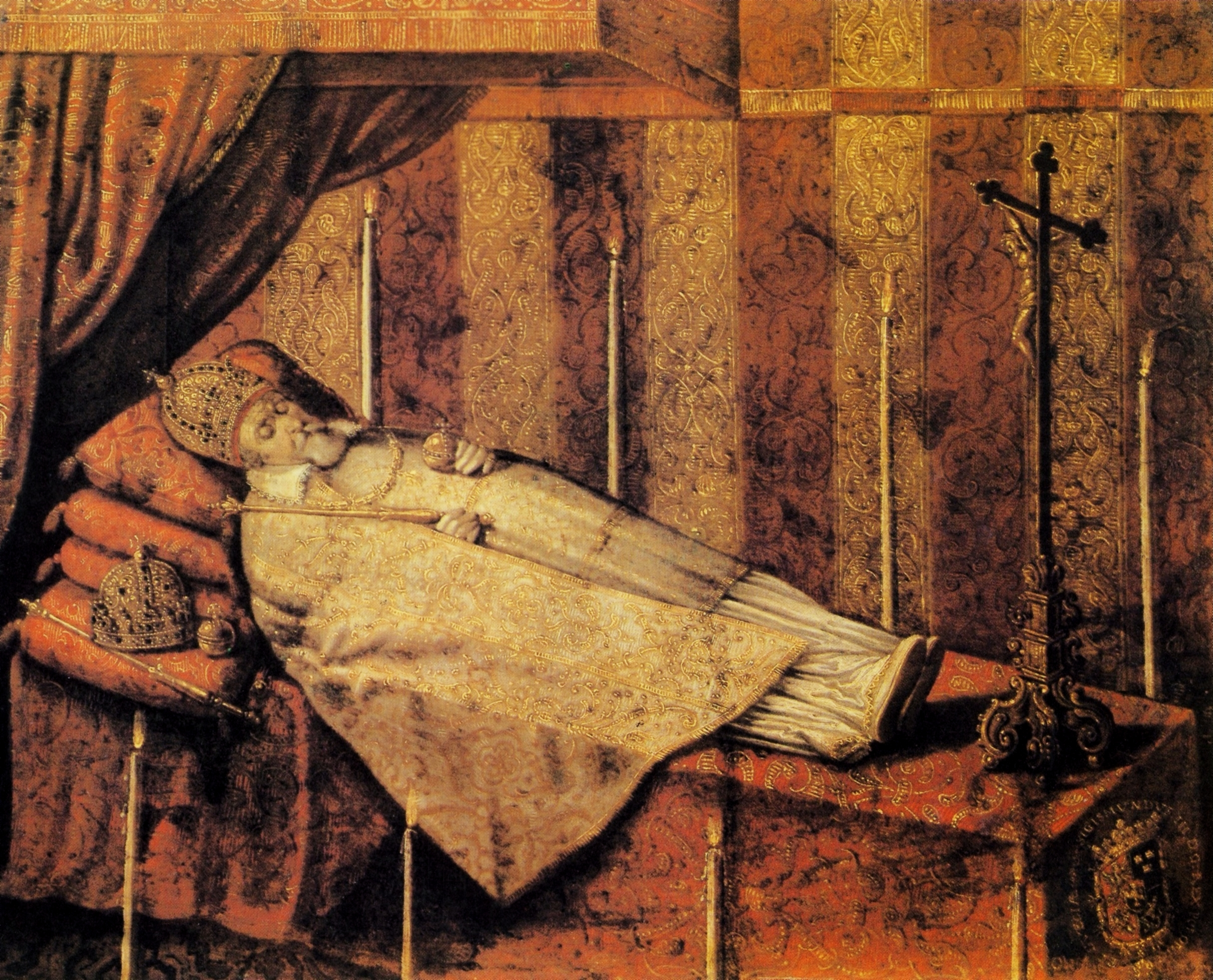
Sigismund III on catafalque following his death

Towards the end of his reign, Sigismund withdrew altogether from politics and devoted himself exclusively to family matters and his interests in the performing arts. Little is known about the King's well being at the time, suggesting that he was in good health. However, in his last days, he became bedridden due to gout and joint pain, an affliction which was likely inherited from his grandfather Sigismund the Old. His uncle, Sigismund II Augustus, also suffered from long-term arthritis.

Shortly after the unexpected death of his second wife, Constance, Sigismund fell dangerously ill and experienced mental problems, notably he was struck with severe depression. In November 1631, bishop Achacy Grochowski travelled to Warsaw and wrote "the monarch is of sound mind, his heart and stomach [abdomen] are healthy". Already in advanced age for the period, on Saint Catherine's Day (25 November) he appeared "cheerful, with a ruddy face, and in good spirit hoped to leave bed". Nevertheless, the gouty arthritis progressed and medics applied red-hot iron to the painful swelling with no effect. The king sensed that death was near and ordered an immediate assembly of nobles, which convened on 1 April. The so-called "extraordinary parliament" (sejm ekstraordynaryjny) secured the candidacy and election of his son, Ladislaus, to the throne. On Easter Sunday he participated in final prayers, whilst being supported by his sons to prevent him from collapsing.

At eight in the morning on 25 April, Kasper Doenhoff, a courtier in charge of opening curtains in the royal bedchamber and greeting the monarch, did not hear a response. Unable to see at a distance, he approached Sigismund, whose face was paralysed from a stroke. Hours later, he briefly recovered his speech and murmured "there is no cure against the will [power] of death". The paralysis worsened and on 27 April Urszula Meyerin acted as spokeswoman, speaking on behalf of the mumbling king. Prince Ladislaus arrived on the same day. On 28 April, Sigismund's bed was surrounded by his courtiers and the Jesuit priests, who performed exorcism-like prayers. It was his wish that the court be witness to his demise, as interpreted in the words "vanitas vanitatis", Latin for "all is vanity".

After days of suffering, Sigismund died at Warsaw's Royal Castle at approximately 02:45 on 30 April 1632. His close aide Albrycht Stanisław Radziwiłł wrote "the autopsy on the same day in the afternoon determined that the king's internal organs were healthy. He could have lived another twenty years". His embalmed body was placed in an elaborate tin coffin decorated with soldiers, battle scenes and musical motifs, a masterpiece of 17th century tin-making. The coffin was interred inside the royal crypt at Wawel Cathedral in Kraków on 4 February 1633.

== Legacy ==
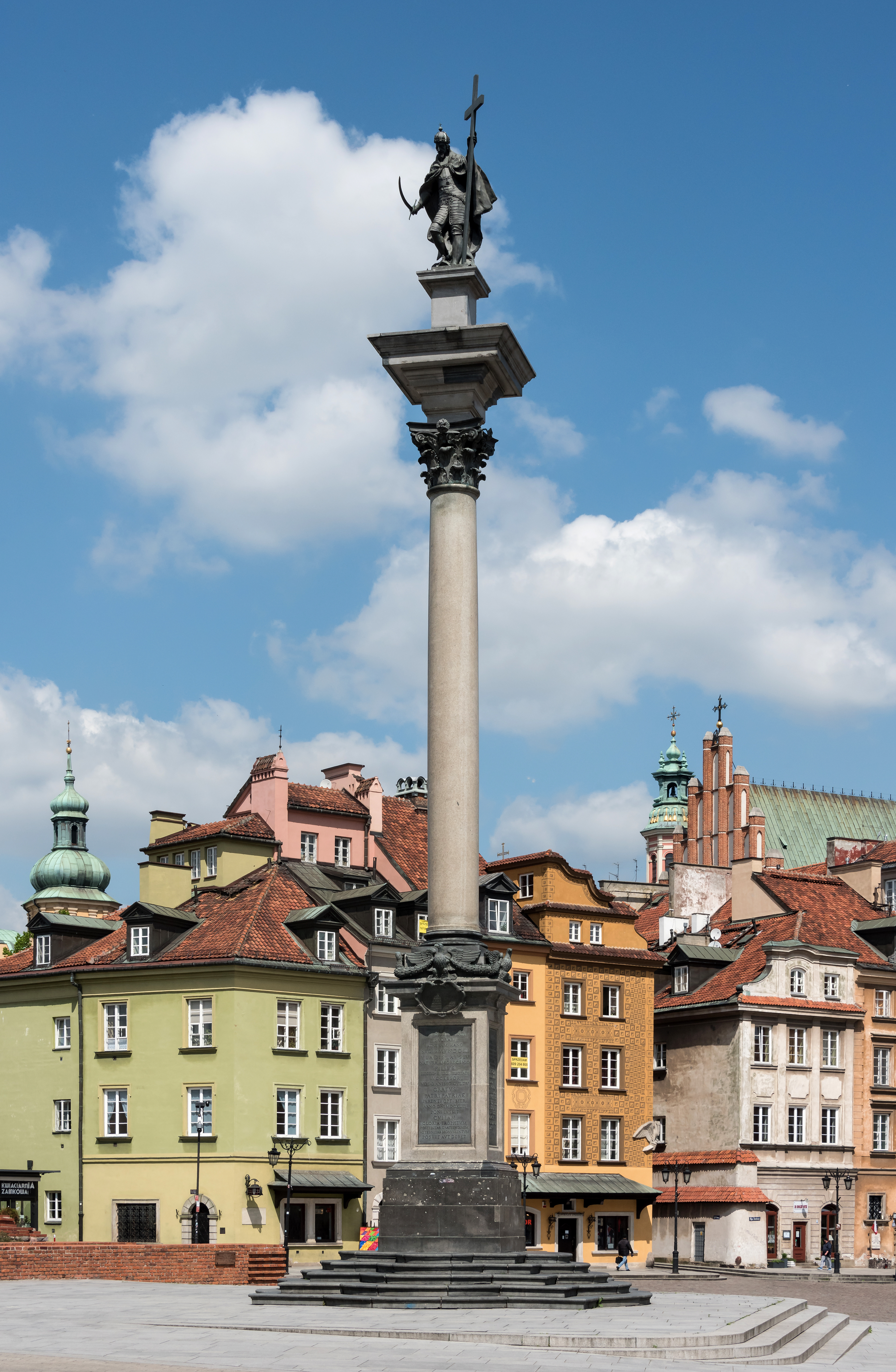
Sigismund's Column (1644) in Warsaw is a reminder of the King's decision to transfer the capital of Poland.

Sigismund's death came at a time of great divisions and constant quarrels. His rule of nearly 45 years is perceived by some as controversial – it was distinguished by considerable developments in architecture, the arts and culture coupled with conspiracies, religious antipathy and the endless conflict with Sweden. Szymon Starowolski positioned Sigismund's legacy above that of his predecessors. Others were less flattering. The decision to appoint Jesuit priests as ministers on matters which did not necessarily concern religion caused ubiquitous disapproval. Spiteful foes convinced of the damage he inflicted on the nation wrote with contempt "this man, whose knowledge exceeded in goldsmithing but not politics, lived far too long". Members of opposing camps were relieved and enthusiastic to see his progressive son, Ladislaus, take the throne. Nonetheless, the nobility and magnates from all political spheres obeyed tradition by wearing black outfits for the duration of the interregnum as a sign of mourning. The strict compliance to the practice is said to have stunned foreign dignitaries. There is no doubt that Sigismund was one of Poland's most capable and recognisable sovereigns.

Sigismund's reign arguably marked an end to the Polish Golden Age and the dawn of the Silver Age. He presided over the transition from cultural Renaissance to the Baroque, and witnessed the first stages of a nationwide literary reform. Notably, it was under his rule that Polish began to supersede Latin in academic thought and artistic expression. Some ground-breaking achievements were made, for example, the publication of Jakub Wujek's Polish translation of the Holy Bible in 1599, which remained in use until the mid-20th century. The period also saw the rise of societal satire, parody and extensive political commentaries which reflected the country's faults in hope of improvement, such as the Eight sermons before the Sejm by Piotr Skarga. However, these works were considered controversial and dangerous to publish, particularly after the failed 1606 rebellion. Józef Szujski notes that the literature became "infested with pleonasms, pasquinades and moral sermon". Consequently, regional councils imposed censorship and suppression of speech. Renowned academician Joannes Broscius (Jan Brożek) wrote a satirical lampoon Gratis directed against the Jesuit priests, which was confiscated and burnt publicly in 1625. Exposed printers and distributors were tied to a pillory and flogged or beaten mercilessly.

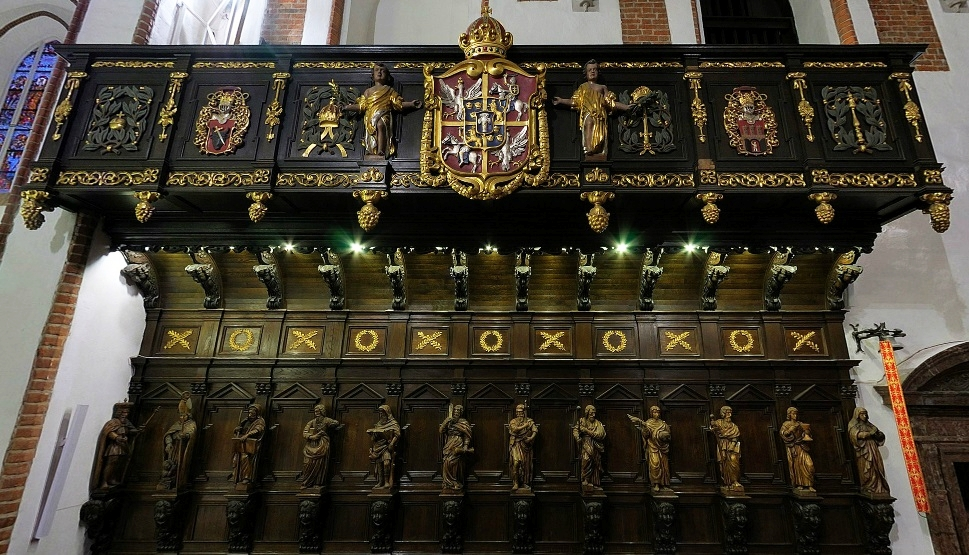
Elaborate choir stalls at Warsaw's St. John's Archcathedral, with Sigismund's personal coat of arms

Franciszek Siarczyński spoke of a cultural revolution that took place at the time and shaped Poland's society for the centuries to come. The simplicity and austerity of older Polish customs faded and were replaced in favour of those from Italy or Germany. Fabrics and garments diversified, thus becoming more striking; Siarczyński writes "clothing, once wool, adorned our sides, now silk, velvet, moire, gold and silver lining. Even a commoner frowns on sheepskin coats. Our coaches and carriages turned ostentatious. We no more venture to our neighbours and camp without the splendour". Jerzy Maternicki outlined that Sigismund was instrumental in developing mining in the Polish–Lithuanian Commonwealth.

The memory of Sigismund III is still vivid in Warsaw, which he expanded and made the capital of Poland in 1596. Władysław IV Vasa ordered the construction of a monument dedicated to his father in the heart of the city as a reminder of the "Sigismundian" legacy. The engineers drew inspiration from the memorials of Ancient Rome, notably the Column of Phocas. The new 22-meter Corinthian column was crowned with a bronze statue of the king wearing armour, holding a cross and a sword. Władysław personally unveiled Sigismund's Column on 24 November 1644 as the first secular column in Europe's modern history.

Sigismund and his sons left a collection of tangible memorabilia, including commemorative coins (numismatics), reliquaries, silverware, tableware, jewellery and precious personal belongings marked with royal monograms or crests.

== Personal life ==
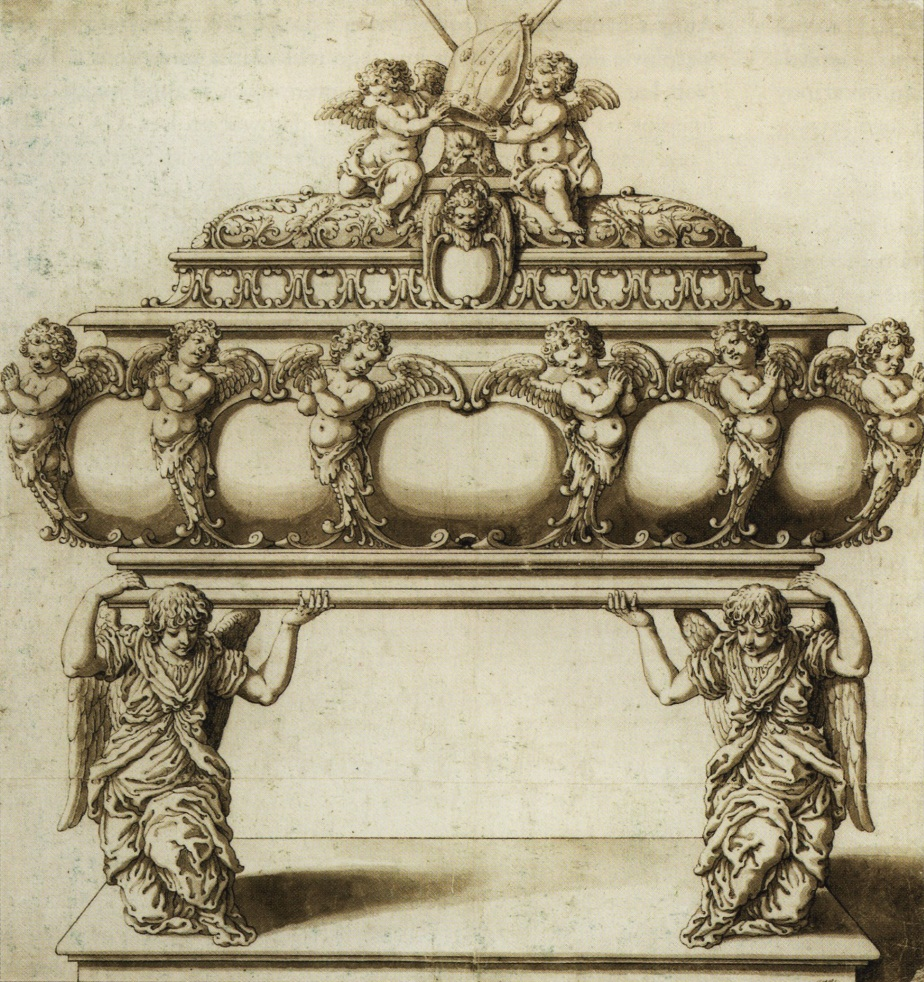
Silver sarcophagus of Saint Stanislaus at Wawel Cathedral is one of several exquisite items commissioned by Sigismund III.

Scholars frequently noted Sigismund's extreme piety, with some calling him a fanatic even during his lifetime. Adherents, however, subtly described it as absolute devotion to religion and Catholic observance, which especially drew praise from papal legates and foreign clerics who visited the court. According to Giovanni Paolo Mucante and Cardinal Enrico Caetani who were sent by Pope Clement VIII, "Sigismund's behaviour was comparable to that of a priest. He fervently attends mass daily, then hears choral music, sermons and orations. He fasts, and practices sexual abstinence on Wednesdays and Fridays, two days before and after confession. This large kingdom would have no schismatics, Calvinists or Lutherans if it depended on him". Historian Paweł Fabisz writes that when James of England and Scotland sent a book with anti-papal connotations, Sigismund deemed the gift "vile" and threw it into the fireplace.

Throughout the entire reign, Sigismund maintained high etiquette and courtliness. Mucante emphasised his frugality and calm nature. Nevertheless, he hosted balls and held masquerades during which he would entertain guests and play the harpsichord. The king was a skilled dancer and performed Polish folk dances as well as Italian dances like the saltarello and passamezzo. Upon the marriage to his first wife, Anne of Austria, on 25 November 1592 he ordered a themed masquerade on Kraków's Main Market Square and, to the disbelief of his subjects, danced for the public. Sigismund was also known to be physically active in his youth and enjoyed occasional hunting, ice skating and frequently played jeu de paume, an early precursor to tennis. Members of the royal court disapproved of such activities, which were perceived as improper and not worthy of a monarch, particularly the sports.

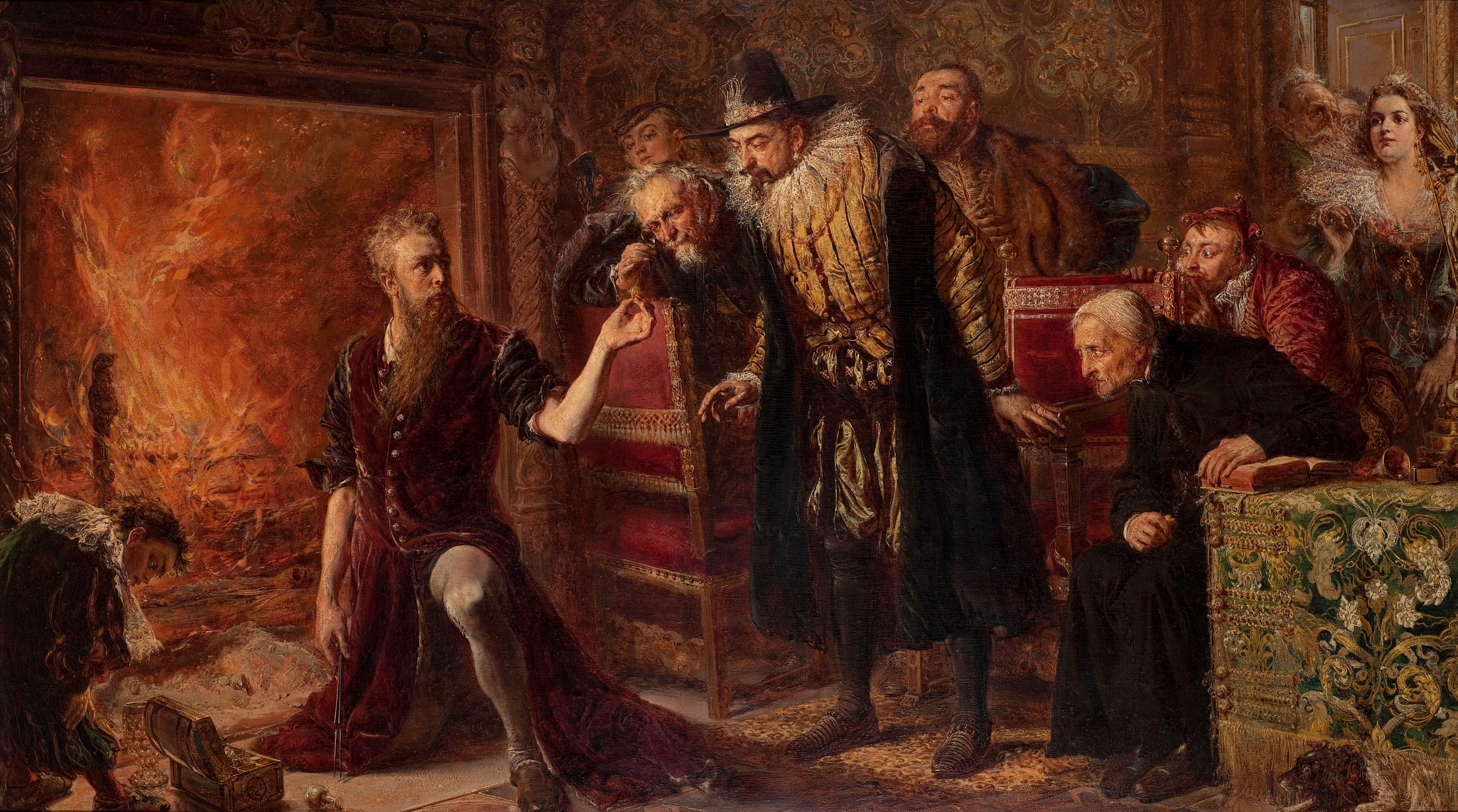
Alchemist Sendivogius and Sigismund III, by Jan Matejko

Sigismund's personal approach to internal affairs was unpredictable; he was said to have been somewhat temperamental and impetuous at times. Joachim Lelewel compared his character to that of the despotic Philip II of Spain, but unlike Philip, who overtly ordered persecution of non-Catholics, Sigismund was more discreet. A determined and stubborn man who sought to strengthen his authority, he was reluctant to participate in pointless conferences. As recalled by his close aide Albrycht Stanisław Radziwiłł, at one meeting the king decided to sketch an owl in his notepad rather than note important advice.

Sigismund held high regard for the arts and early Baroque architecture; he willingly sponsored foreign masters and engineers who came to Poland at his invitation. He actively took part in the designing of façades and structural elements as well as Eucharistic objects such as chalices, crucifixes, candelabra and even book covers. During a visit to the Lwów Bernardine Church in 1621, he reprimanded the chief planners for making the temple seem disproportionate. Sigismund was a gifted painter and craftsman; only a few of his works survive, among them parts of Saint Adalbert's silver reliquary at the Cathedral in Gniezno. He was also fascinated by alchemy and ancient methods of turning metals into gold; it is said he experimented with the alchemist and philosopher Michael Sendivogius.

=== Marriages and children ===
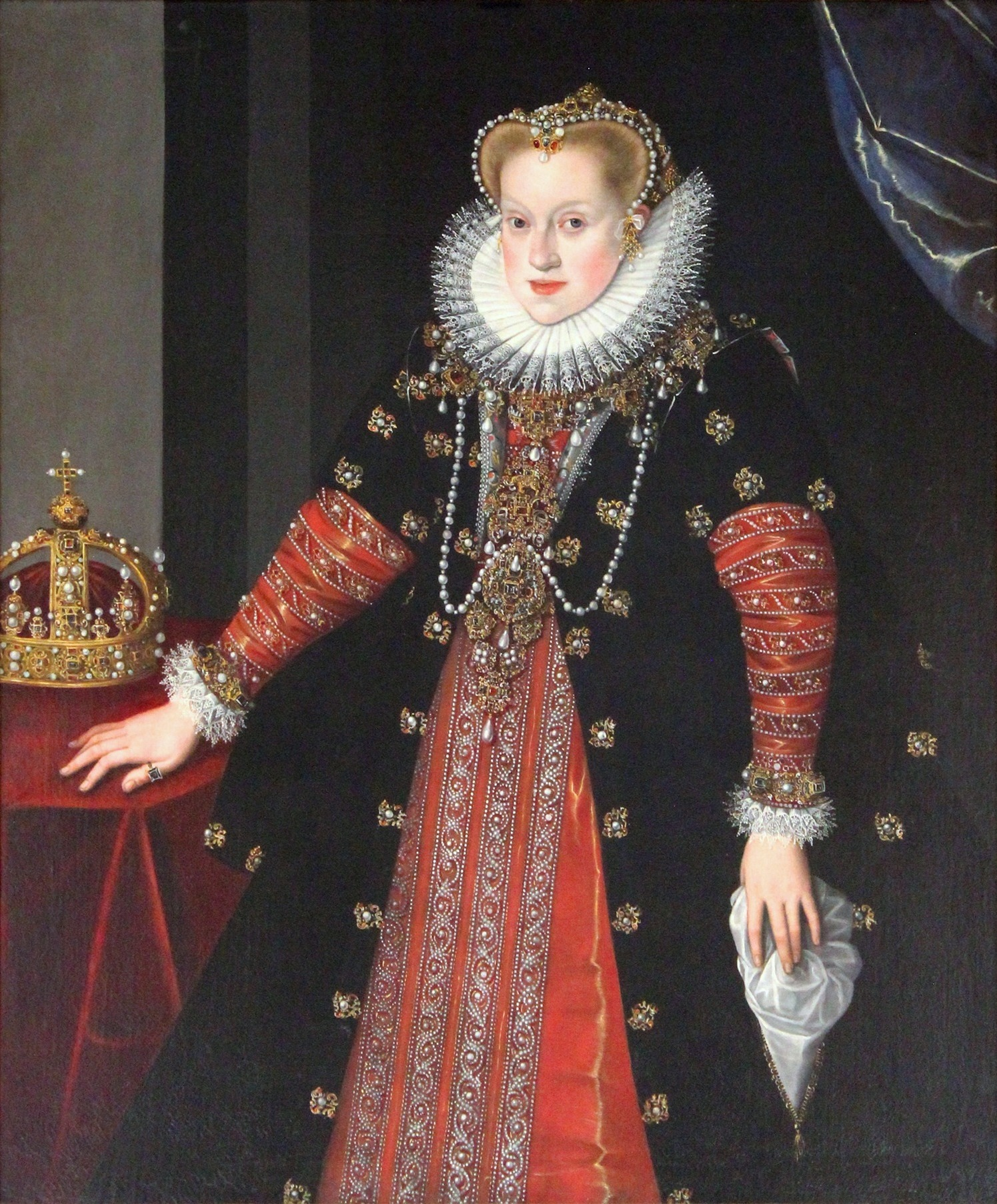
Anne of Habsburg was Sigismund's first consort. An introvert, she was known for her hostile attitude towards Sweden and Protestantism.

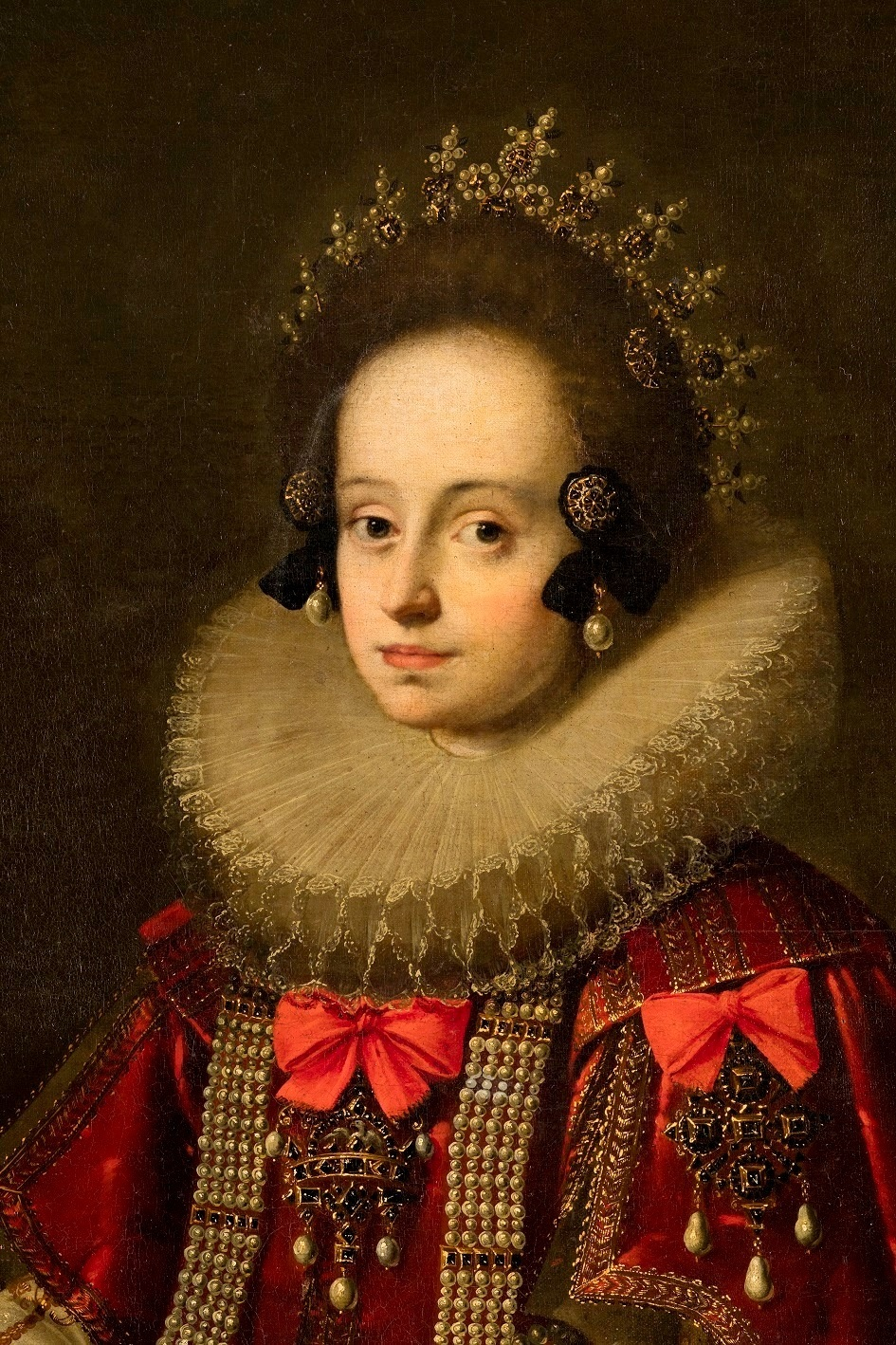
Constance of Habsburg, Anne's sister and Sigismund's second consort. A devout Catholic, she supported Sigismund in political endeavours.

On 31 May 1592, Sigismund married his first wife Anne of Austria (1573–1598), daughter of Archduke Charles II of Austria and his wife Maria Anna of Bavaria. She was well received in Poland, despite being a Habsburg. Certain leading magnates were initially opposed to the marriage, however, the opinion shifted in her favour due to personal characteristics; she was known to be attentive, sharp-minded, humble, pious and kind, though of poor health. The couple led a happy but introverted life. Anne was particularly hostile towards the Swedes; her attitude was shaped by an unsuccessful visit to Sweden in 1593, where she was said to have been mistreated. She complained of the cold and general misery in Sweden, and fell ill there in October 1593. The continuous stress arising from the unpredictable behaviour of Charles Vasa (future King Charles IX and adversary of Sigismund) also contributed to her distaste. According to an account, she gave birth in Stockholm to a baby girl named Catherine who died soon after and was secretly buried upon their return to Poland. Her health rapidly deteriorated with successive pregnancies over the next four years. Anne died while pregnant with the last child, soon followed by her posthumously delivered newborn son, on 10 February 1598 in Warsaw. Following her death, Sigismund was in deep mourning; he expressed sorrow in private letters to his mother-in-law Maria Anna of Bavaria, and isolated himself from subjects. Anne and Sigismund had five known children during their marriage:

1. Anne Marie (Polish: Anna Maria; 23 May 1593 – 9 February 1600);
2. Catherine (Polish: Katarzyna; May 1594 – June 1594);
3. Ladislaus (Polish: Władysław; 9 June 1595 – 20 May 1648), reigned 1632 – 1648 as Władysław IV;
4. Catherine (Polish: Katarzyna; 27 September 1596 – June 1597);
5. Christopher (Polish: Krzysztof; b. and d. 10 February 1598).

Sigismund was expected to marry Anna of Tyrol in 1603, but Emperor Rudolf II did not give his consent. Instead, on 11 December 1605, he wedded Constance of Austria (1588–1631), Anne's younger sister. The match was condemned by nobles and clerics who previously opposed Anne and the Habsburg alliance; the match was savagely described as "incestuous". The death of Jan Zamoyski, leader of the opposition, in June 1605 allowed for the marriage to take place without incidents. Some threatened to abandon the royal court, notably Piotr Skarga. The marriage further fuelled the anger of Sigismund's most vocal adversaries, Nicholas Zebrzydowski. The wedding ceremony and Constance's entrance into Kraków was so ostentatious it was recorded in the form of a large gouache roll painting known as rolka sztokholmska, now housed in Sweden. Like her sister, Constance was well-educated and religious; she attended mass two to four times a day. She was also a good mother who particularly cared for her stepson, Ladislaus, even in his twenties. On the other hand, Constance approved of her husband's struggle for absolute power; she maintained considerable influence over Sigismund and the senators. To the general public, she appeared cold, strait-laced, intolerant and even antisemitic; in 1626, she forbade the Jews to settle in the town of Żywiec, which she privately owned and administered. Under her patronage, Austro-German culture as well as Spanish fashion flourished at the court. Constance died on 10 July 1631 from a heat stroke she suffered after attending mass on the Feast of Corpus Christi weeks earlier. They had seven children:

1. John Casimir (Polish: Jan Kazimierz; 25 December 1607 – 14 January 1608);
2. John Casimir (Polish: Jan Kazimierz; 22 March 1609 – 16 December 1672), reigned 1648 – 1668 as John II Casimir;
3. John Albert (Polish: Jan Albert/Olbracht; 25 May 1612 – 22 December 1634);
4. Charles Ferdinand (Polish: Karol Ferdynand; 13 October 1613 – 9 May 1655);
5. Alexander Charles (Polish: Aleksander Karol; 4 November 1614 – 19 November 1634);
6. Anna Constance (Polish: Anna Konstancja; 26 January 1616 – 24 May 1616);
7. Anna Catherine Constance (Polish: Anna Katarzyna Konstancja; 7 August 1619 – 8 October 1651), the first wife of Philip William, Elector Palatine.

=== Urszula Meyerin ===
The nature of the relationship between Sigismund and one of his trusted courtiers, Urszula Meyerin, has been continually questioned by Polish historians. Born in Munich as Ursula Gienger, she came to Poland with the cortège of future queen Anne in 1592. The king was said to have been infatuated with Urszula, who was known to be attractive and pious. Upon her arrival, she became involved in the affairs of state and was appointed chamberlain (ochmistrzyni in Polish) at the Queen's court. To emphasise her political role and importance, she adopted the Old German equivalent to the title of chamberlain, "Meyerin", as her sobriquet and official name. She devotedly assisted in raising the children and, with time, acted as their tutor.

Meyerin's position as grey eminence and influence on the royal couple made her immensely unpopular among the nobility. Consequently, she was compared to the Spanish Duke of Lerma, who ruled in the king's stead, and contemptuously described as "the king's mistress", "ravenous gold-digger", "minister in a skirt" or "Jesuit's bigotry". Sigismund's secretary Jan Szczęsny Herburt in his memoirs called her "an obscene favourite". However, it is unknown whether the relations between the two were physical.

== Gallery ==
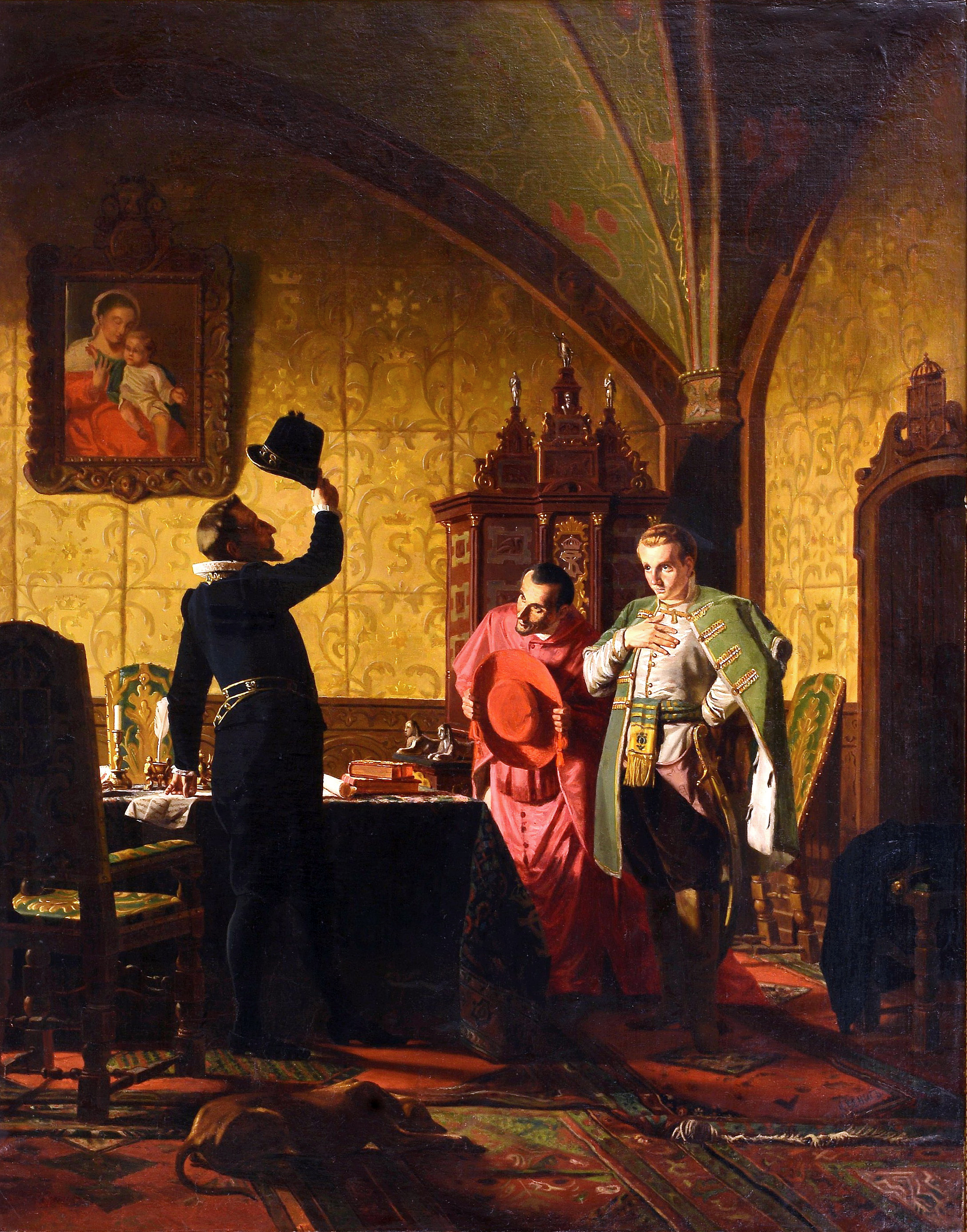
False Dmitriy I takes an oath of allegiance to Sigismund III, by Nikolai Nevrev (1874).

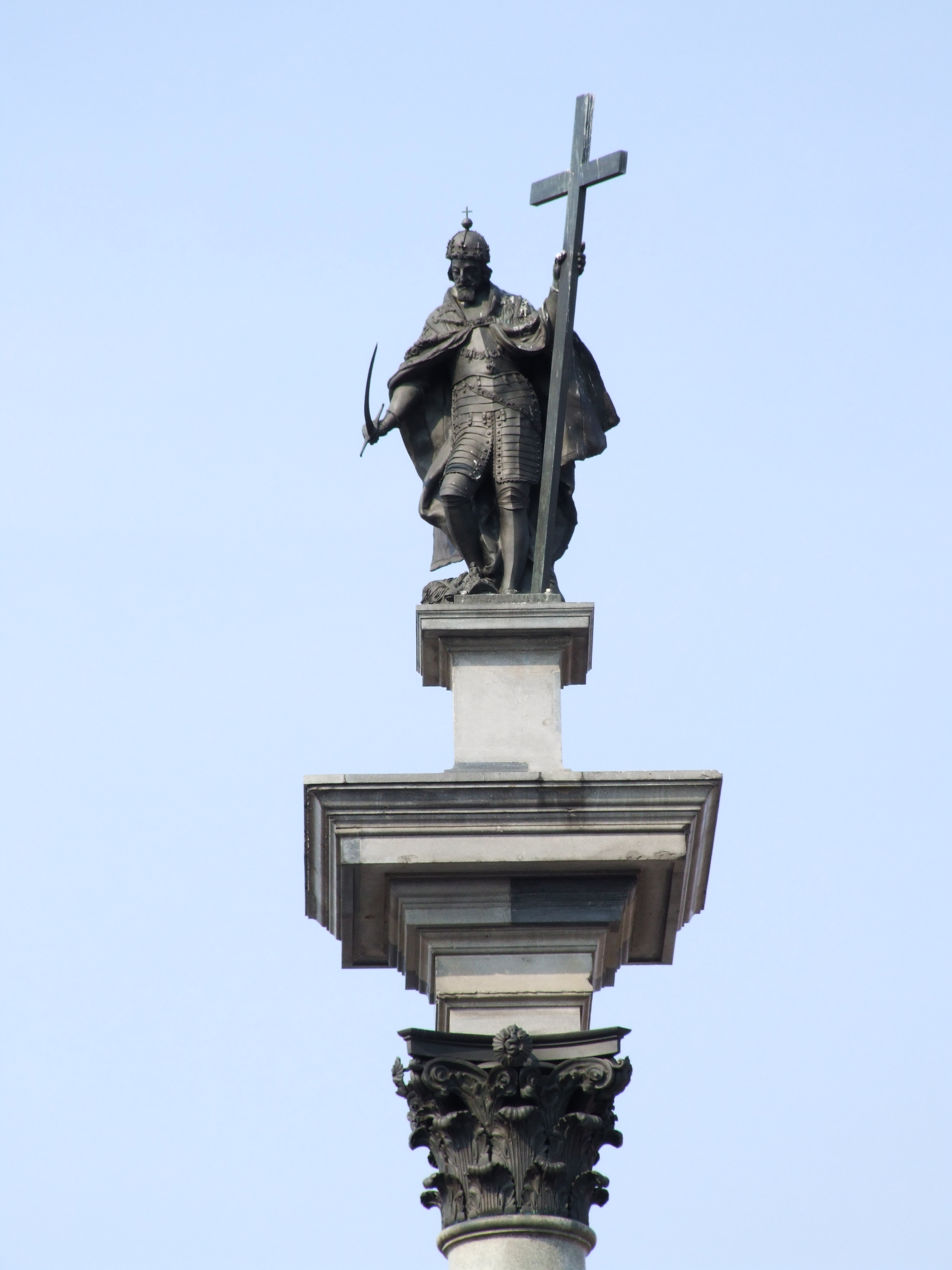
Statue of King Sigismund III on top of Sigismund's Column in Warsaw

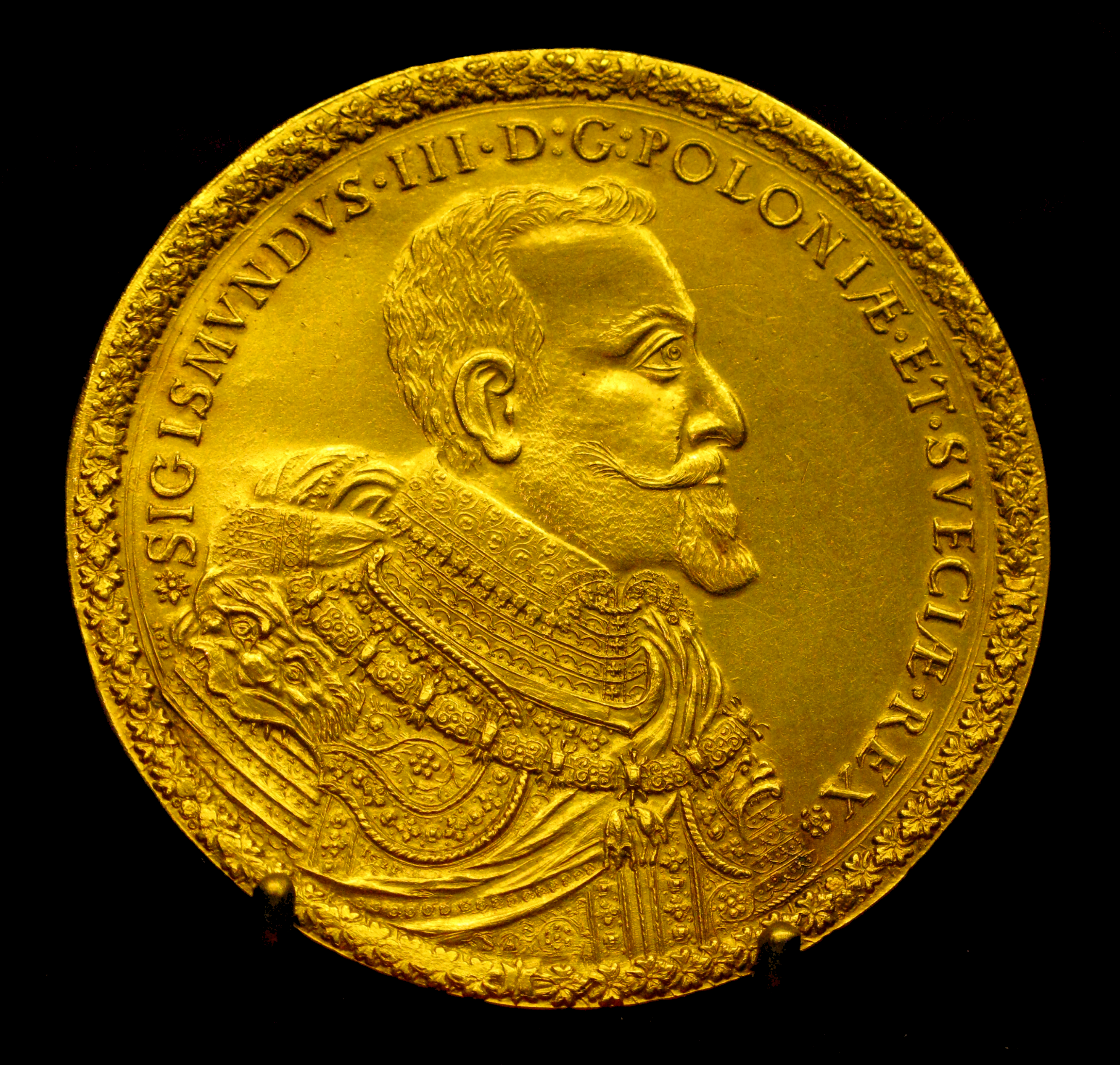
A 40-ducat coin depicting King Sigismund III Vasa, 1621

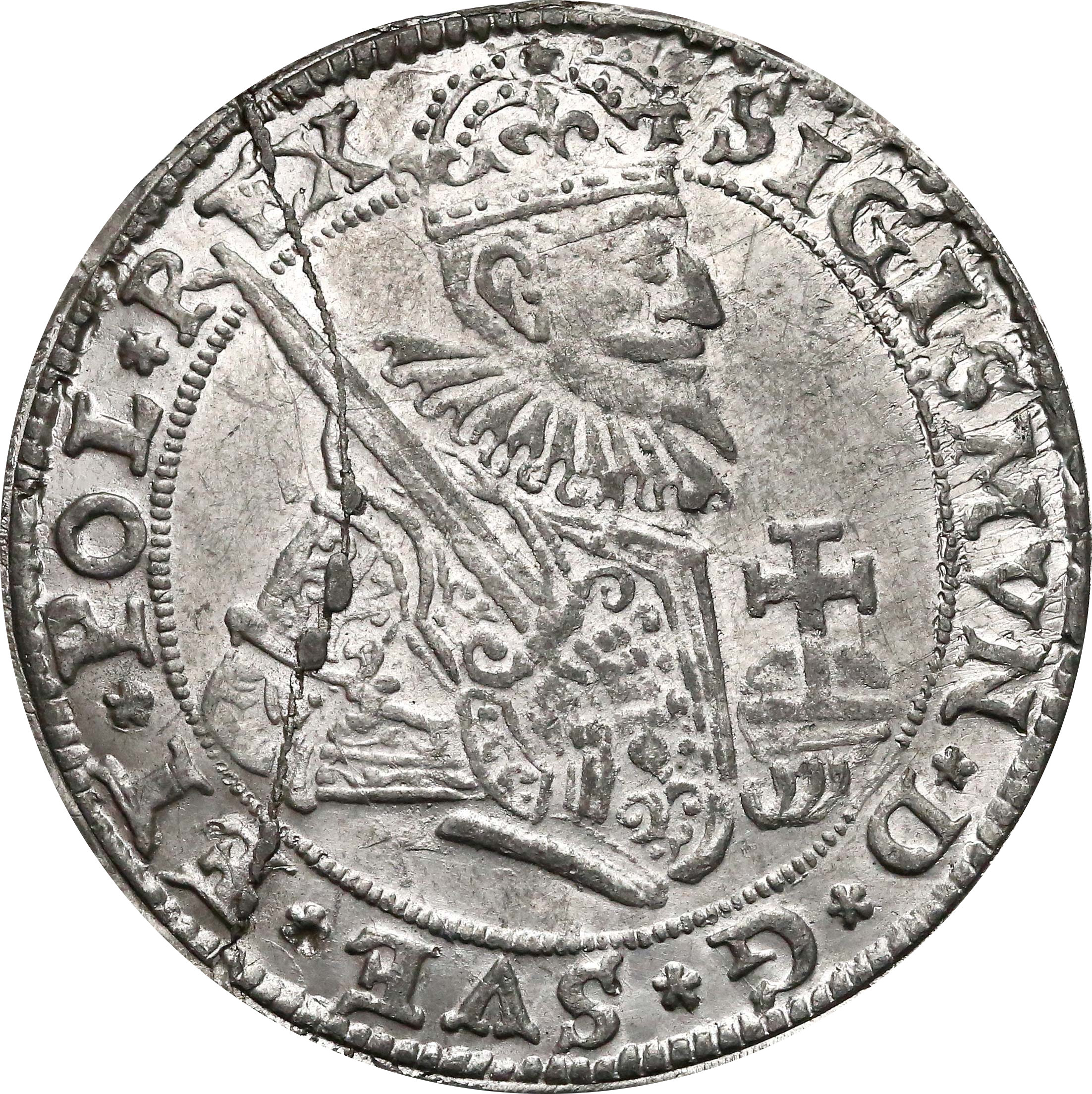
One of King Sigismund's coins

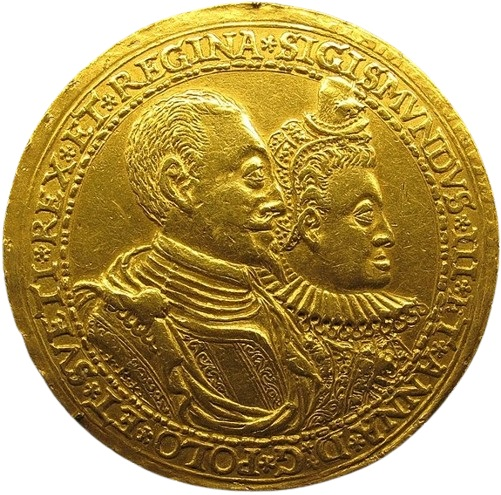
Gold coin featuring King Sigismund and Queen Anne, 1598

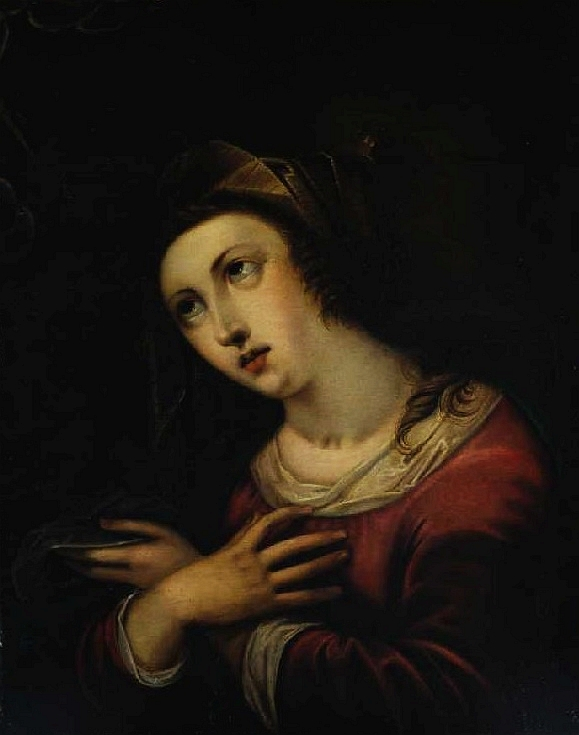
Mater Dolorosa painted by Sigismund in the 1620s, based on works by Gortzius Geldorp

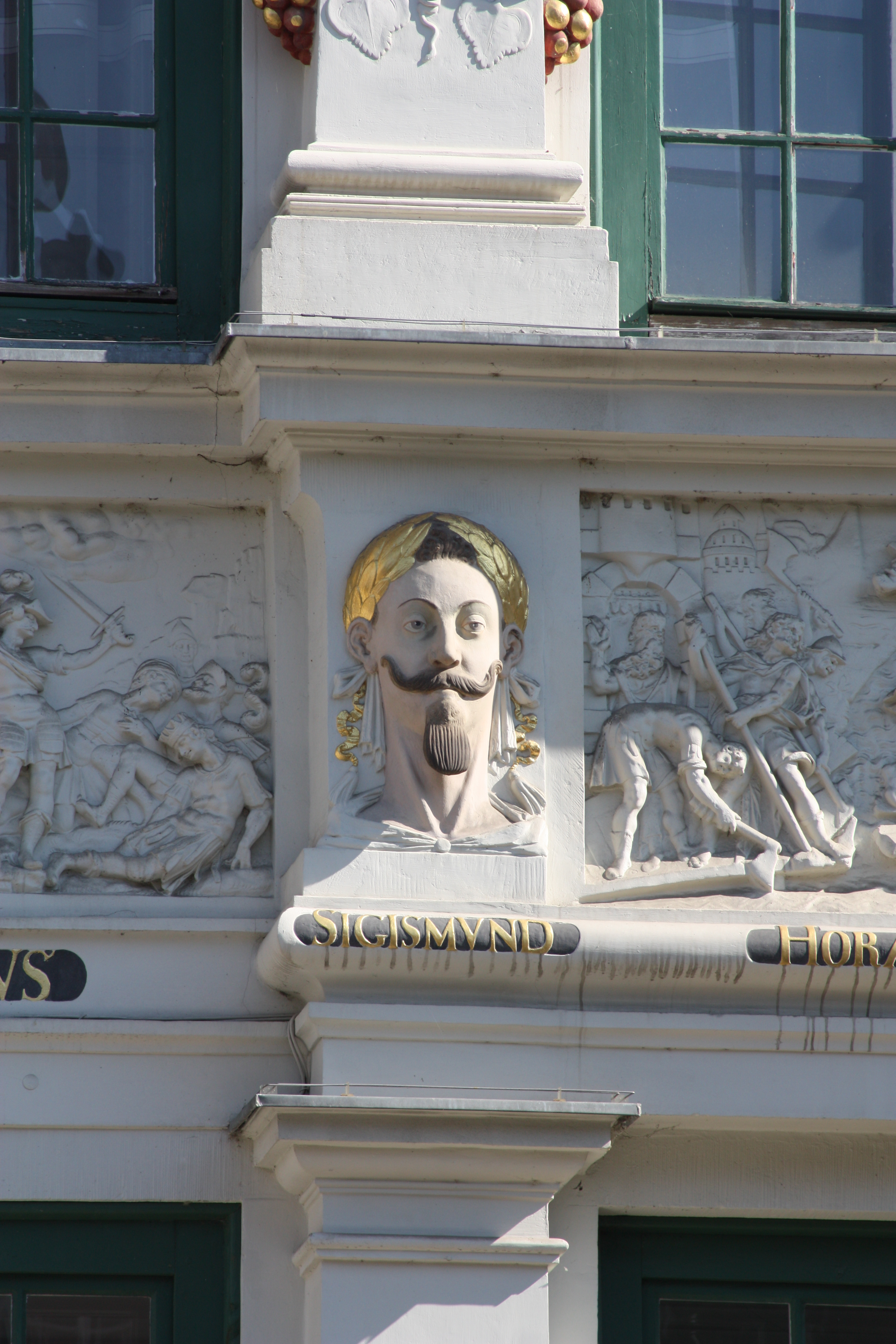
Facade relief on the Golden House in Gdańsk

Banner used during Sigismund III Vasa's reign

== Ancestry ==
Ancestors of Sigismund III Vasa

8. Erik Johansson Vasa
4. Gustav I of Sweden
9. Cecilia Månsdotter
2. John III of Sweden
10. Erik Abrahamsson Leijonhufvud
5. Margaret Leijonhufvud
11. Ebba Eriksdotter Vasa
1. Sigismund III Vasa
12. Casimir IV of Poland
6. Sigismund I of Poland
13. Elisabeth of Austria
3. Catherine of Poland
14. Gian Galeazzo Sforza
7. Bona Sforza
15. Isabella of Naples

== See also ==
- History of Poland (1569–1795)
- History of Sweden (1523–1611)
- Unions of Sweden

== Bibliography ==
- A ́goston, Ga ́bor; Masters, Bruce Alan (2010). Encyclopedia of the Ottoman Empire. Infobase Publishing. ISBN 9781438110257.
- Allen, W. E. D. (2017). Embassies to the Georgian Kings, 1589–1605: Volumes I and II. Taylor & Francis. ISBN 9781317060406.
- Andersson, Ingvar (1979). Erik XIV. Wahlström & Widstrand. ISBN 91-46-13566-9.
- Andrusiewicz, Andrzej (1999). Dzieje wielkiej smuty (in Polish). Śląsk. ISBN 9788371640704.
- Bain, Robert Nisbet (1911). "Sigismund III" . Encyclopædia Britannica. Vol. 25 (11th ed.). pp. 68–69.
- Bain, R. Nisbet (2013) [1908]. Slavonic Europe. Cambridge University Press. ISBN 9781107636910.
- Besala, Jerzy (2009). Najsłynniejsze miłości królów polskich (in Polish). Bellona Publishing House. ISBN 9788311115996.
- Bogucka, Maria (1994). Anna Jagiellonka (in Polish). Zakład Narodowy im. Ossolińskich. ISBN 9788304041165.
- Bojarska, Anna (2004). Zastrzelony jadłospis, czyli, Trochę o mitologii polskiej (in Polish). Vis-á-vis/Etiuda. ISBN 9788389640178.
- Buchen, Tim (August 2020). Antisemitism in Galicia. Berghahn Books. p. 50. ISBN 9781789207712.
- Bulgarin, Ḟaddej (1857). Dymitr Samozwaniec. Obrazy historyczne z wieku XVII. Vol. 1. Sanok: Pollak. OCLC 830817270.
- Burek, Ryszard (2000). Encyklopedia Krakowa (in Polish). Kraków: PWN. ISBN 9788301133252.
- Chmielowski, Piotr (1887). Nasi powieściopisarze (in Polish). Vol. 1. Kraków: Żupański i Heumann. OCLC 558807324.
- Ciechanowicz, Jerzy (1994). Medea i czereśnie (in Polish). Krąg. ISBN 9788385199236.
- Clark, Christopher M. (2009). Prusy. Powstanie i Upadek 1600-1947 (in Polish). Bellona Publishing House. ISBN 9788311116283.
- Conroy, Charles C. (1917). The reformation; a series of articles published in The Tidings. Wayside Press. OCLC 14769918.
- Cooper, J. P. (1979). The New Cambridge Modern History: Volume 4, The Decline of Spain and the Thirty Years War, 1609-1648/1649. Cambridge University Press. ISBN 9780521297134.
- Cynarski, Stanisław (1988). Zygmunt August (in Polish). Zakład Narodowy im. Ossolińskich. ISBN 9788304026704.
- Czarnowski, Stanisław Jan (1895). Dziennikarstwo słowiańskie i polskie (in Polish). Kraków: Gebethner i Spółka. OCLC 1021783451.
- Czerenkiewicz, Michał (2019). Polonia illustrata (in Polish). Scholar. ISBN 9788365390493.
- Czermiński, Marcin (1907). Na Lewantyńskich i Szwedzkich Wybrzeżach (in Polish). Czas. OCLC 750614796.
- Czwojdrak, Bożena (2007). Bohaterowie historii Polski (in Polish). Videograf II. ISBN 9788371834103.
- Dabrowski, Patrice M. (2014). Poland. The First Thousand Years. Cornell University Press. ISBN 9781501757402.
- Dowley, Tim (2018). Introduction to the History of Christianity. Vol. 3. Minneapolis: Fortress Press and 1517 Media. ISBN 9781506446035.
- Dunning, Chester S. L. (2010). Russia's First Civil War: The Time of Troubles and the Founding of the Romanov Dynasty. Penn State University Press. ISBN 9780271043715.
- Dyer, Thomas Henry (1861). The History of Modern Europe. Vol. From the Fall of Constantinople, in 1453, to the War in the Crimea, in 1857. Volume 2. J. Murray.
- Dzięgielewski, Jan (1994). Encyklopedia historii Polski: A-M (in Polish). Morex. ISBN 9788390252216.
- Encyklopedia powszechna (in Polish). Vol. 28. Samuel Orgelbrand. 1868. OCLC 741865525.
- Fabisz, Paweł Władysław (1864). Wiadomość o legatach i nuncyuszach apostolskich w dawnej Polsce (1075-1863) (in Polish). Ostrów: Priebatsch. OCLC 1027034338.
- Finn, Kavita Mudan; Schutte, Valerie (2018). The Palgrave Handbook of Shakespeare's Queens. Cham, Switzerland: Palgrave Macmillan and Springer International Publishing. ISBN 9783319745183.
- Folger Shakespeare Library (2004). "1597" (PDF). Folgerpedia. pp. 23–24.
- Franz, Maciej (2006). Idea państwa kozackiego na ziemiach ukrainnych w XVI-XVII wieku (in Polish). Adam Marszałek. ISBN 9788374415460.
- Frost, R. I. (2000). The Northern Wars, 1558–1721. Harlow: Pearson Education. ISBN 9780582064294.
- Gajda, Stanisław (2001). Język polski (in Polish). Opole: Uniwersytet Opolski. ISBN 9788386881314.
- Geijer, Eric Gustave (1845). The History of the Swedes. London: Whittaker and Company. OCLC 983127659.
- Gillespie, Alexander (2017). The Causes of War. Vol. III: 1400 CE to 1650 CE. Portland: Bloomsbury Publishing. ISBN 9781509917662.
- Górski, Karol (2008). Zarys dziejów katolicyzmu polskiego (in Polish). Wydawn. Naukowe Uniwersytetu Mikołaja Kopernika. ISBN 9788323123118.
- Grabowski, Ambroży (1868). Groby, trumny i pomniki królów polskich w podziemiach i wnętrzu Katedry krakowskiej na Wawelu (in Polish). Kraków: Kirchmayer. OCLC 22609407.
- Halecki, Oskar; Reddaway, W. F.; Penson, J. H. (1950). The Cambridge History of Poland. Cambridge University Press.
- Haska, Agnieszka (2018). Hańba! Opowieści o polskiej zdradzie (in Polish). WAB. ISBN 9788328055438.
- Horn, Ildikó (2002). Báthory András [Andrew Báthory] (in Hungarian). Új Mandátum. ISBN 963-9336-51-3.
- Instytut Historii (2000). Studia źródłoznawcze (in Polish). Vol. 37. Polish Scientific Publishers PWN. OCLC 1111851482.
- Itzkowitz, Norman (2008). Ottoman Empire and Islamic Tradition. University of Chicago Press. ISBN 9780226098012.
- Jacobsen, Douglas (2011). The World's Christians. United Kingdom: Wiley-Blackwell. ISBN 9781444397291.
- Janiszewska-Mincer, Barbara (1984). Rzeczpospolita Polska w latach 1600-1603; narastanie konfliktu między Zygmuntem III Wazą a stanami (in Polish). Bydgoszcz: Uczelniane Wyższej Szkoły Pedagogicznej w Bydgoszczy. OCLC 877321287.
- Jankowski, Jerzy (1995). "Metresa z różańcem w dłoni (Mistress with a rosary in her hand)". Monarsze sekrety (Secrets of the Monarchs ) (in Polish). Toporzeł. ISBN 83-85559-12-4.
- Jaques, Tony (2007). Dictionary of Battles and Sieges: F-O. Greenwood Press. ISBN 9780313335389.
- Jaques, Tony (2019). Dictionary of Battles and Sieges: A-E. Greenwood Publishing Group. ISBN 9780313335372.
- Jędruch, Jacek (1982). Constitutions, Elections, and Legislatures of Poland, 1493–1977. University Press of America. ISBN 9780819125095.
- Karpowicz, Mariusz (1994). Matteo Castello, architekt wczesnego baroku (in Polish). Neriton. ISBN 9788390240701.
- Kiliński, Teodor (1872). Dzieje narodu polskiego z tablicą chronologiczną aż do naszych czasów dla użytku młodżiezy z dodatkiem jeografii i mapy dawnéj Polski (in Polish). Poznań: Kamieński. OCLC 749148106.
- Kishlansky, Mark A.; Geary, Patrick J.; O'Brien, Patricia (2002). A Brief History of Western Civilization. Longman. ISBN 9780321097002.
- Kizwalter, Tomasz (1987). Kryzys Oświecenia a początki konserwatyzmu polskiego (in Polish). Uniwersytet Warszawski. OCLC 23942204.
- Kolodziejczyk, Dariusz (2011). The Crimean Khanate and Poland-Lithuania. Brill Publishers. ISBN 9789004191907.
- Komasara, Irena (1994). Książka na dworach Wazów w Polsce (in Polish). Ossolineum. ISBN 9788304041844.
- Konopczyński, Władysław (1937). "Jan Karol Chodkiewicz". Polski Słownik Biograficzny, T. 3: Brożek Jan – Chwalczewski Franciszek (in Polish). Kraków: Polska Akademia Umiejętności – Skład Główny w Księgarniach Gebethnera i Wolffa. OCLC 780836057.
- Korytkowski, Jan (1889). Arcybiskupi gnieźnieńscy prymasowie i metropolici polscy (in Polish). Vol. 3. Poznań: Kuryer Poznański. OCLC 866606642.
- Korzon, Tadeusz (1889). Historyja nowożytna: do 1648 roku (in Polish). Vol. 1. Kraków: G. Gebethner. OCLC 705855545.
- Koskinen, Ulla (2016). Aggressive and Violent Peasant Elites in the Nordic Countries, C. 1500–1700. Springer International Publishing. ISBN 9783319406886.
- Koszarski, Grzegorz; Haase, Theodor (1864). Postyla, albo wykłady ewanielij niedzielnych i świąt uroczystych (in Polish). Cieszyn: Prochaska. OCLC 561165924.
- Król, Stefan (1988). 101 kobiet polskich (in Polish). Książka i Wiedza. ISBN 9788305114301. OCLC 578258698.
- Krzyzkowski, Dan (2017). Critical Mass. Bloomington: iUniverse. ISBN 9781532033520.
- Kurkowska, Grażyna (1995). Anna Wazówna. Toruń: Towarzystwo Naukowe w Toruniu. ISBN 9788385196068.
- Larned, Josephus Nelson; Reiley, Allan Campbell (1895). History for Ready Reference, from the Best Historians, Biographers, and Specialists: Nicæa-Tunis. C. A. Nichols Company. OCLC 679498381.
- Lechicki, Czesław (1932). Mecenat Zygmunta III i życie umysłowe na jego dworze (in Polish). Kasa im. Mianowskiego. OCLC 721799057.
- Lelewel, Joachim (1845). Historiczna parallela Hispanii z Polską w wieku XVI., XVII., XVIII. Wydanie drugie (in Polish). Poznań: Stefański. OCLC 561695535.
- Lerski, Halina (19 January 1996). Historical Dictionary of Poland, 966–1945. ABC-Clio. ISBN 9780313034565.
- Lileyko, Jerzy (1984). Życie codzienne w Warszawie za Wazów (in Polish). Państwowy Instytut Wydawniczy. ISBN 9788306010213.
- Louda, Jiří; Maclagan, Michael (1991). Lines of Succession. Heraldry of the Royal Families of Europe. New York: Macmillan Publishers. ISBN 9780028972558.
- Maternicki, Jerzy (2004). Wielokulturowe środowisko historyczne Lwowa w XIX i XX w (in Polish). Vol. 3. Rzeszów: Uniwersytet Rzeszowski. ISBN 9788373382411.
- Millar, James R. (2004). Encyclopedia of Russian History. Vol. 4. Gale (publisher). ISBN 9780028656977.
- Miłobędzki, Adam (1980). Dzieje sztuki polskiej: Architektura polska XVII wieku (in Polish). Panstwowe Wydawnictwo Naukowe. ISBN 9788301013639.
- Moraczewski, Jędrzej (1865). Dzieje Rzeczypospolitej Polskiej, przez Jędrzejn Moraczewskiego (in Polish). Vol. 7–8. N. Kamieński. OCLC 12992612.
- Morawska, Katarzyna (2014). Renesans (in Polish). Sutkowski Edition. ISBN 9788390079028.
- Morawski, Teodor (1877). Dzieje Narodu Polskiego W Krótkości Zebrane; Królowie Obieralni (in Polish). Vol. 3. Poznań: Żupański. OCLC 68637965.
- Muzeum Narodowe w Szczecinie (2004) [1986]. Materiały zachodniopomorskie (in Polish). Vol. 32. Szczecin: Muzeum Narodowe. OCLC 1250072913.
- Mykowski, Jarosław; Klat, Marek (2001). Treasury of Poland (in Polish). Gdańsk: Oficyna Pomorska. ISBN 9788386527410.
- Niemcewicz, Julian Ursyn; Turowski, Kazimierz Józef (1860). Dzieje panowania Zygmunta III. Vol. 1. Kraków: Czas. OCLC 29776263.
- Niemcewicz, Julian Ursyn (1860). Dzieje panowania Zygmunta III (in Polish). Vol. 3. Kraków: Biblioteka Polska. OCLC 29776263.
- Nowak, Andrzej (2019). History and Geopolitics: A Contest for Eastern Europe. PISM. ISBN 9788389607287.
- Ochmann-Staniszewska, Stefania (2006). Dynastia Wazów w Polsce (in Polish). Wydawnictwo Naukowe PWN. ISBN 9788301145842.
- Orgelbrand, Samuel (1861). Encyklopedia Powszechna (in Polish). Vol. 7. Warszawa: Samuel Orgelbrand. OCLC 4945657.
- Pałucki, Władysław (1974). Drogi i bezdroża skarbowości polskiej XVI i pierwszej połowy XVII wieku (in Polish). Zakład Narodowy im. Ossolińskich. OCLC 462970365.
- Pawłowska-Kubik, Agnieszka (2019). Rokosz sandomierski 1606–1609. Rzeczpospolita na politycznym rozdrożu (in Polish). Wydawnictwo Naukowe Uniwersytetu Mikołaja Kopernika. ISBN 9788323142850.
- Pears, Edwin (1893). "Pears The Spanish Armada and the Ottoman Porte". The English Historical Review. 8. The English Historical Review. ISSN 0013-8266.
- Peterson, Gary Dean (2014). Warrior Kings of Sweden. The Rise of an Empire in the Sixteenth and Seventeenth Centuries. McFarland & Company. ISBN 9781476604114.
- Piasecki, Paweł (1870). Kronika P. Piaseckiego Biskupa Przemyślskiego (in Polish). Kraków: Uniwersytet Jagielloński. OCLC 503878438.
- Piwarski, Kazimierz (1947). Prusy Wschodnie w dziejach Polski. Stefan Kamiński. OCLC 234328807.
- Piwarski, Kazimierz (1961). Szkice z dziejów papiestwa (in Polish). Książka i Wiedza. OCLC 249739095.
- Podhorodecki, Leszek (1978). Stanisław Koniecpolski ok. 1592–1646 (in Polish). Wydawnictwo Ministerstwa Obrony Narodowej. OCLC 750901261.
- Podhorodecki, Leszek (1985). Rapier i koncerz: z dziejów wojen polsko-szwedzkich. Warsaw: Książka i Wiedza. ISBN 83-05-11452-X.
- Podhorodecki, Leszek (1988). Stanisław Żółkiewski (in Polish). University of Michigan & Ludowa Spółdzielnia Wydawnicza. p. 306. ISBN 9788320540826.
- Podhorodecki, Leszek (2008). Chocim 1621 (in Polish). Polska: Bellona Publishing House. ISBN 9788311112643.
- Podraza, Antoni (2006). Europa, Galicja, regiony (in Polish). Kraków: Księgarnia Akademicka. ISBN 9788371888434.
- Polska Akademia Umiejętności (1923). "Encyklopedya polska". Gebethner i Wolff.
- Prokop, Krzysztof Rafał (1999). Poczet biskupów krakowskich (in Polish). Kraków: Wydawn. Św. Stanisława BM Archidiecezji Krakowskiej. ISBN 9788387960384.
- Prothero, George Walter; Ward, Adolphus William; Leathes, Stanley Mordaunt (1906). The Cambridge Modern History. Vol. 4. Macmillan Publishers. OCLC 874478915.
- Pushkin, Alexander (2018). Boris Godunov and Little Tragedies. Richmond, Surrey: Alma Books. ISBN 9780714545912.
- Rastawiecki, Edward (1857). Słownik malarzów polskich, tudzież obcych w Polsce osiadłych, lub czasowo w niej przebywających (in Polish). Warszawa: Samuel Orgelbrand. OCLC 1171984765.
- Reading, Mario (2019). The Complete Prophecies of Nostradamus. Sterling Publishing. ISBN 9781906787394.
- Roberts, Michael (1953). Gustavus Adolphus: a history of Sweden, 1611–1632. Longmans. OCLC 504254730.
- Rocznik krakowski (in Polish). Vol. 51. Kraków: Wydawn. Tow. Miłośników Historii i Zabytków Krakowa. 1987. ISBN 9788301074524.
- Rotteck, Carl (1843). Obraz historyi powszechnej od najdawniejszych do najnowszych czasów (in Polish). Vol. 2. August Emmanuel Glückeberg. OCLC 982630397.
- Rudzki, Edward (1987). Polskie królowe. Żony królów elekcyjnych, Tom II (Polish Queens. Wives of the elective kings, Volume II) (in Polish). Wydawnictwo Literackie. OCLC 1170487741.
- Saar, Alicja (1995). Infantka Szwecji i Polski Anna Wazówna (in Polish). Toruń: Uniwersytet Mikołaja Kopernika. ISBN 9788385196143.
- Schmitt, Henryk (1858). Rokosz Zebrzydowskiego (in Polish). Lwów: Ossoliński. OCLC 31723561.
- Showalter, Dennis (2013). Early Modern Wars 1500–1775. Amber Books Ltd. ISBN 9781782741213.
- Shubin, Daniel H. (2009). Tsars and Imposters. Russia's Time of Troubles. New York: Algora. ISBN 9780875866871.
- Siarczyński, Franciszek (1843). Obraz wieku panowania Zygmunta III. Króla Polskiego i Szwedzkiego: zawieraiący opis osób żyiących pod jego panowaniem, znamienitych przez swe czyny pokoiu i woyny, cnoty lub występki dzieła piśmienne, zasługi użyteczne i cele sztuki (in Polish). Poznań: Nowa Księgarnia. OCLC 643150186 – via Google Books.
- Sitkowa, Anna (1998). Na połów dusz ludzkich (in Polish). Energeia. ISBN 9788385118947.
- Spórna, Marcin; Wierzbicki, Piotr; Wygonik, Edyta (2003). Słownik władców Polski i pretendentów do tronu polskiego (in Polish). Zielona Sowa. ISBN 9788372205605.
- Sokół, Krystyna (1966). Dzieje Polski a współczesność (in Polish). Książka i Wiedza. OCLC 1090948544.
- Starźa, Józef Aleksander (1851). Stanisław Żółkiewski; obraz historyczny z czasów Stefana i Zygmunta III (in Polish). Vol. 1. Berlin: Behr. OCLC 995364246.
- Stebelski, Ignacy (1867). Chronologia (in Polish). Vol. 2. Lwów: Zelman Igel. OCLC 749155509.
- Stone, David R. (2019). A Military History of Russia: From Ivan the Terrible to the War in Chechnya. Greenwood Publishing Group. ISBN 9780275985028.
- Szujski, Józef (1894). Dzieła Józefa Szujskiego. Dzieje Polski (in Polish). Vol. 3. Kraków: Szujski-Kluczycki. OCLC 717123162.
- Talbierska, Jolanta (2011). Grafika XVII wieku w Polsce. Funkcje, ośrodki, artyści, dzieła (in Polish). Neriton. ISBN 9788375431964.
- Tańska-Hoffman, Klementyna (1851). Encyklopedya doręczna (in Polish). Orgelbrand. OCLC 297528908.
- Tatomir, Lucjan (1868). Geografia ogólna i statystyka ziem dawnej Polski (in Polish). Kraków: "Czas", Kirchmayer. OCLC 869416558.
- Treadgold, Donald W. (1973). Russia, 1472–1917. Cambridge University Press. ISBN 9780813302553.
- Tretiak, Józef (1889). Historya wojny chocimskiej, 1621 r (in Polish). Lwów: Seyfarth i Czajkowski. OCLC 80314989.
- Tyszkiewicz, Count Eustachy (1846). Listy o Szwecji pisał E. Tyszkiewicz (in Polish). Vol. 1. Vilnius (Wilno): Zawadzki. OCLC 504798558.
- Varvounis, Miltiades (2016). Made in Poland: The Women and Men Who Changed the World. UK: Xlibris. ISBN 9781524596644.
- Watra-Przewłocki, J. (1918). Historya Polski ilustrowana (in Polish). Worzałła Publishing. OCLC 728066803.
- Wdowiszewski, Zygmunt (2005). Genealogia Jagiellonów i Domu Wazów w Polsce (in Polish). Avalon. ISBN 9788391849729.
- Wisner, Henryk (1984). Zygmunt III Waza (in Polish). Wydawnictwa Szkolne i Pedagogiczne. ISBN 9788302020896.
- Wisner, Henryk (1989). Rokosz Zebrzydowskiego (in Polish). Krajowa Agencja Wydawnicza. ISBN 9788303026163.
- Wisner, Henryk (2002). Rzeczpospolita Wazów: Czasy Zygmunta III i Władysława IV (in Polish). Vol. 1. Neriton. ISBN 9788388973352.
- Wójcicki, Kazimierz Władysław (1848). Album; literackie pismo zbiorowe poświęcone dziejom i literaturze krajowej (in Polish). Vol. 1–2. W. Druk. Rządowej przy Kommissyi Rządowej Sprawiedliwości. OCLC 830495467.
- Zarewicz, Ludwik (1876). Przegląd lwowski (in Polish). Vol. 6, Issues 13–18. Lwów: X. E. Podolski. OCLC 837240117.
- Zieliński, Władysław Kornel (1878). Monografia Lublina (in Polish). Vol. 1. Lublin: J. Herszenhorn & M. Sznajdermesser. OCLC 1014590007.

Sigismund III Vasa House of Vasa Born: 20 June 1566 Died: 30 April 1632
Regnal titles
Preceded by Anna Jagiellon; Stephen Báthory	King of Poland; Grand Duke of Lithuania; 1587 – 1632	Succeeded by Władysław IV
Preceded by John III of Sweden	King of Sweden; 1592 – 1599	Vacant Title next held by Charles IX of Sweden
Titles in pretence
Loss of title Deposed by Charles IX	— TITULAR — King of Sweden; 1599 – 1632	Succeeded by Władysław IV Vasa
