= Warmia =

Historical region of Poland

Coordinates: 53.8°N 20.5°E

Warmia Warńija
- Historical region
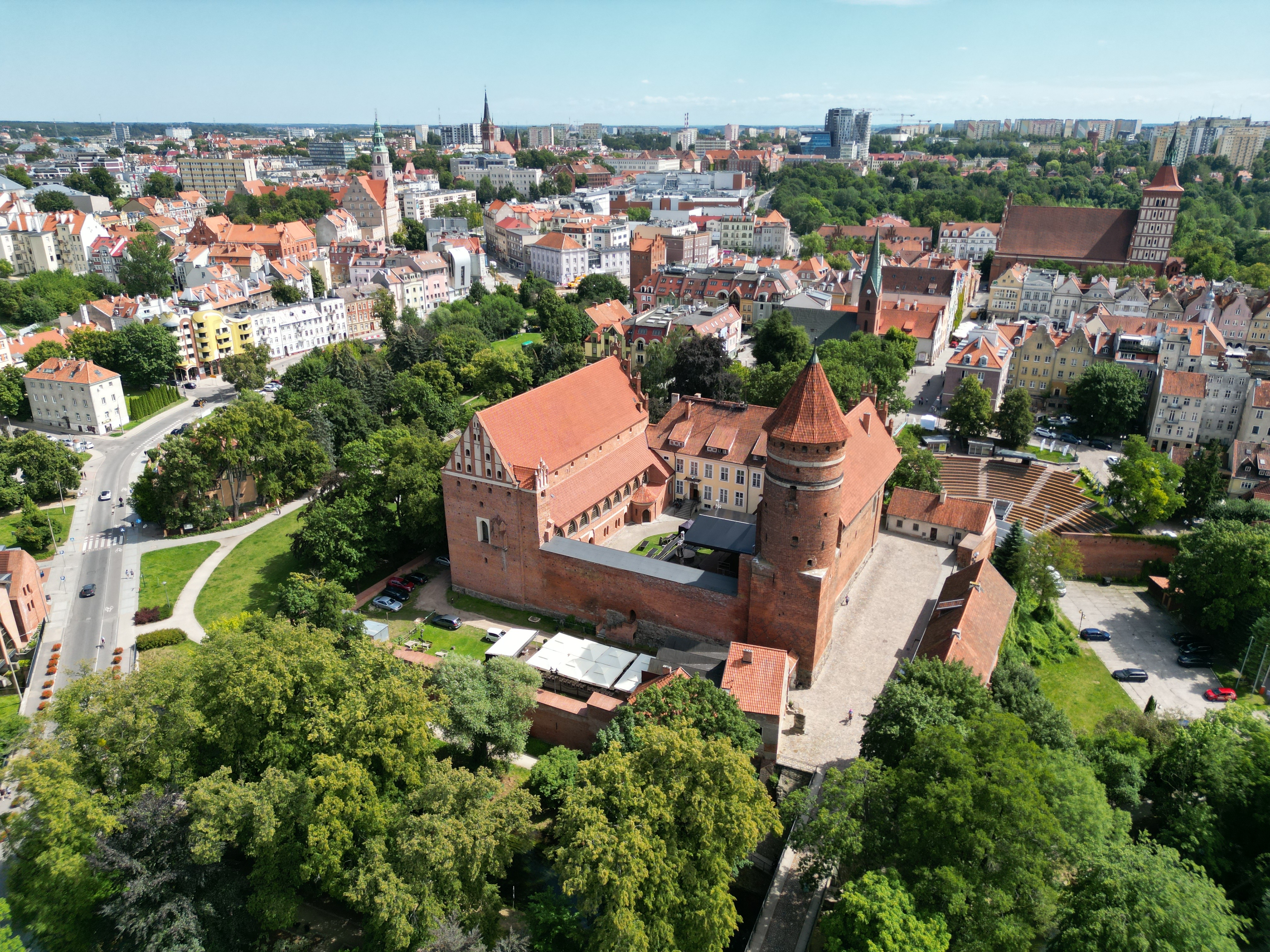
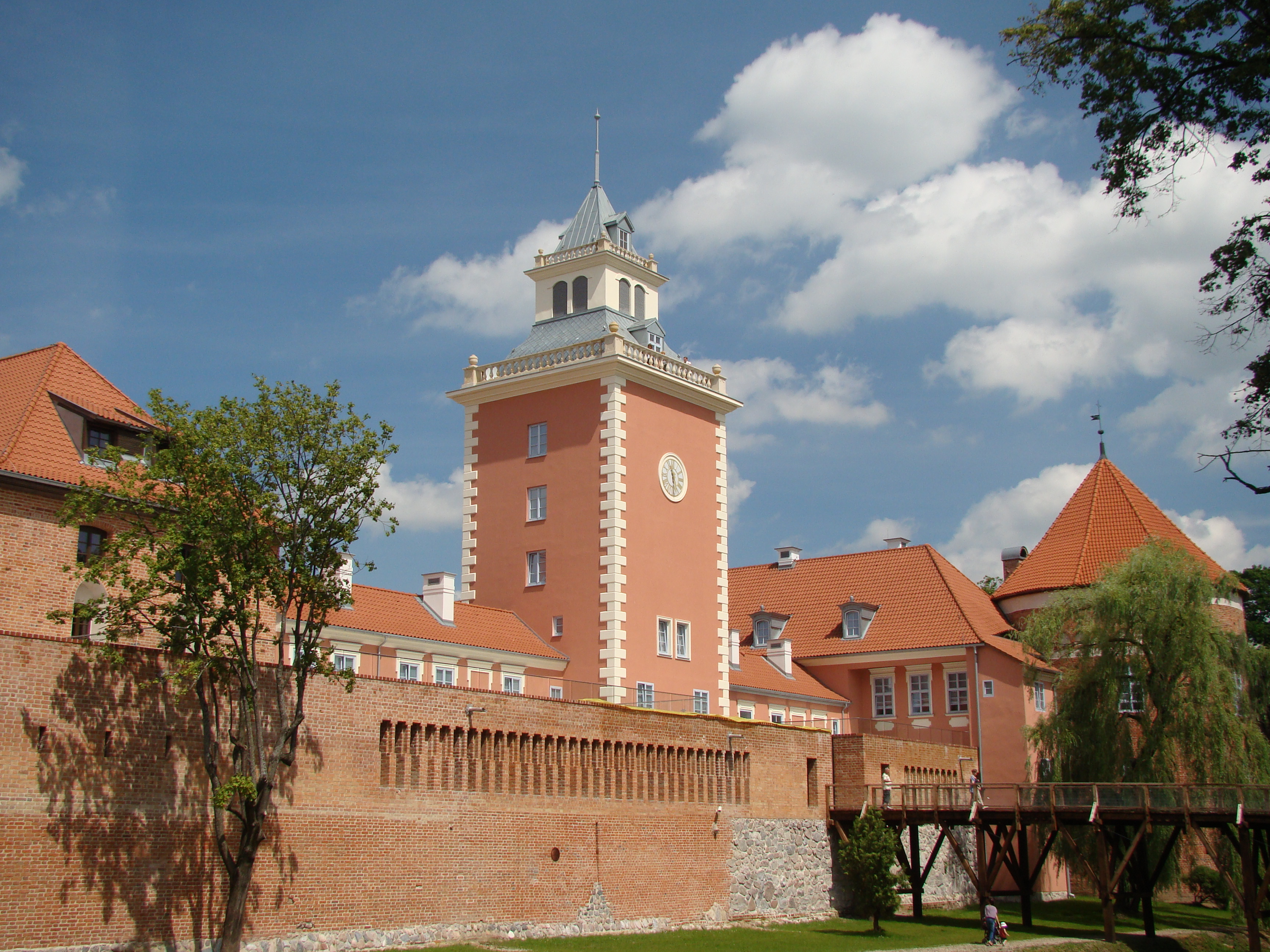
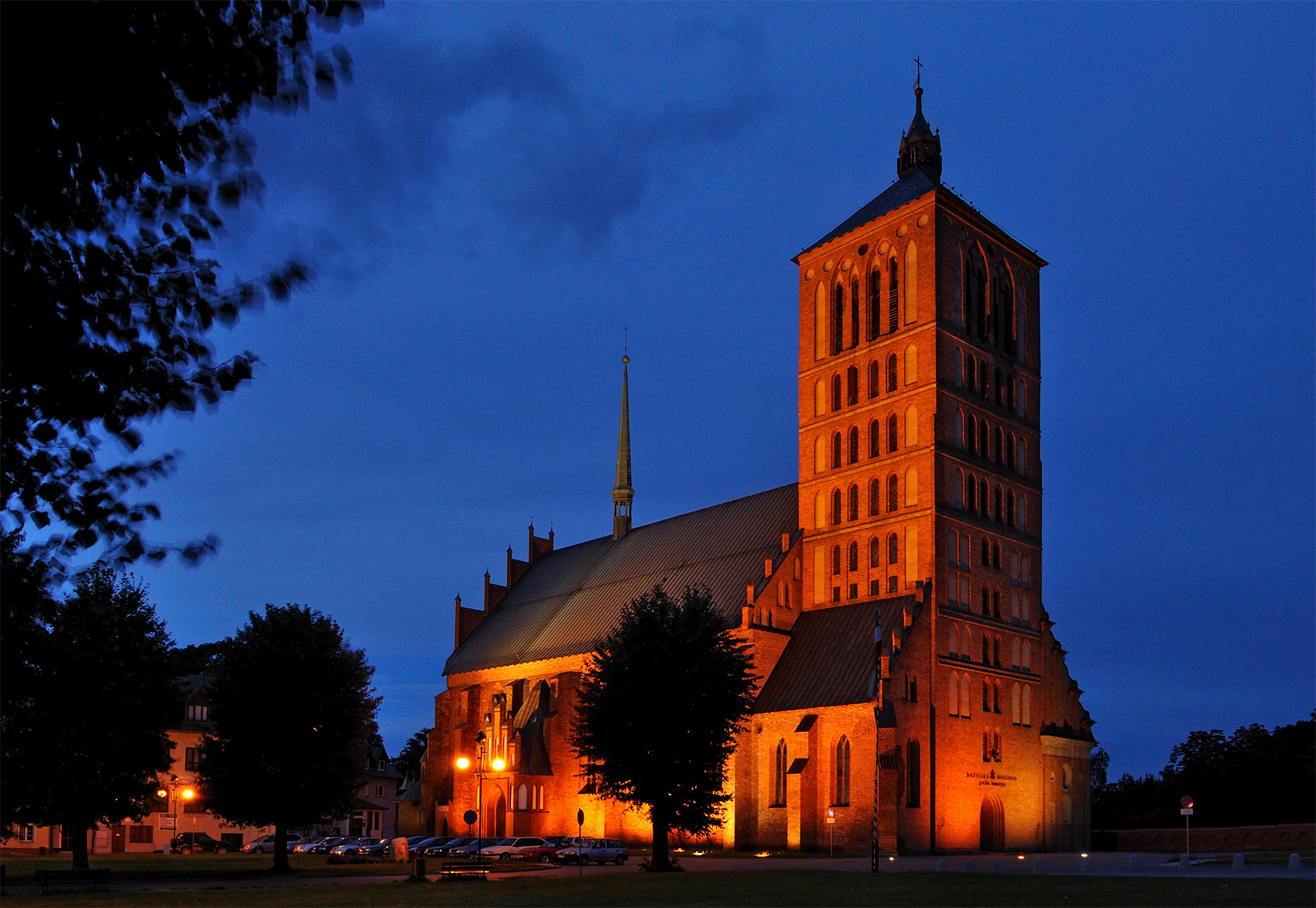
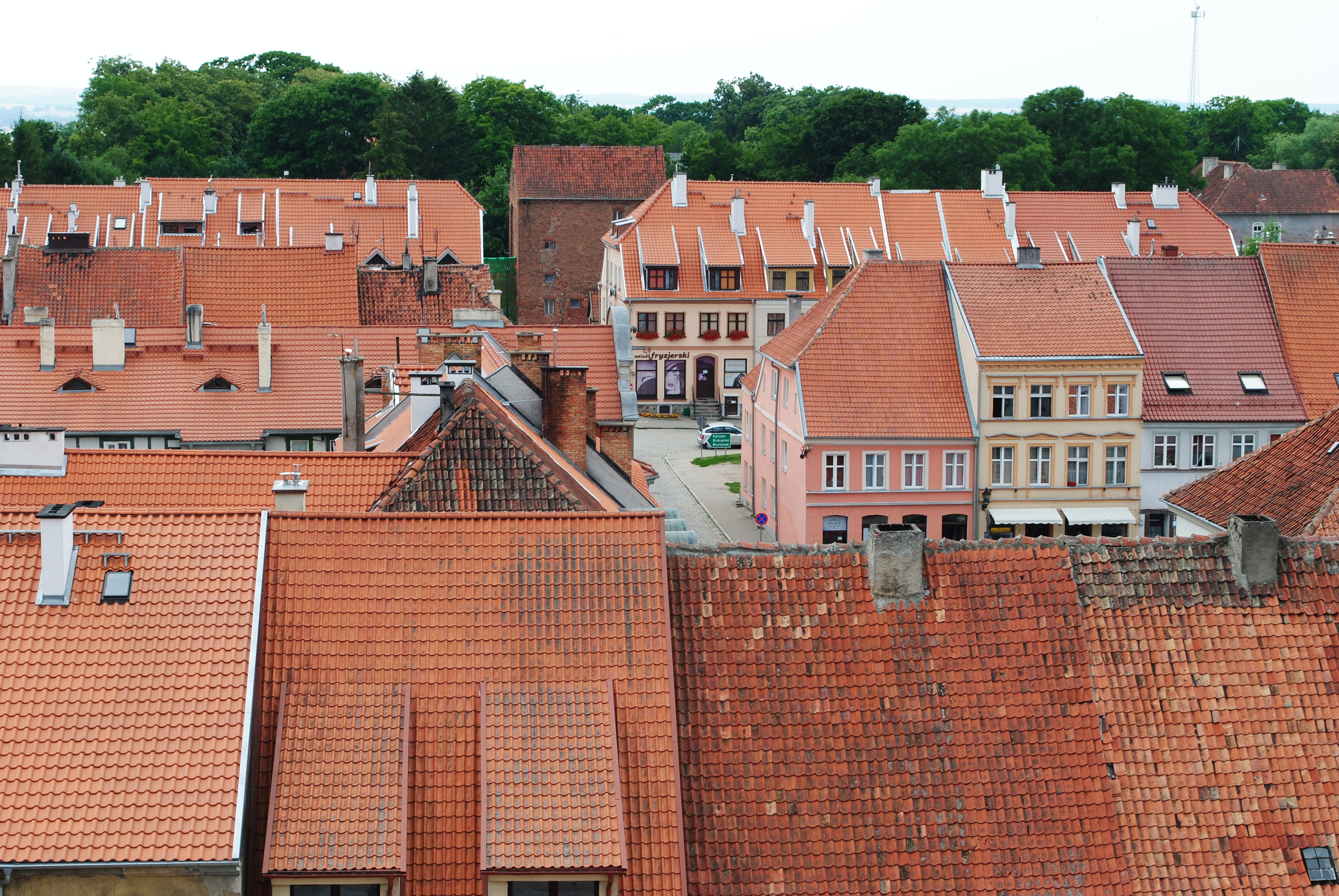
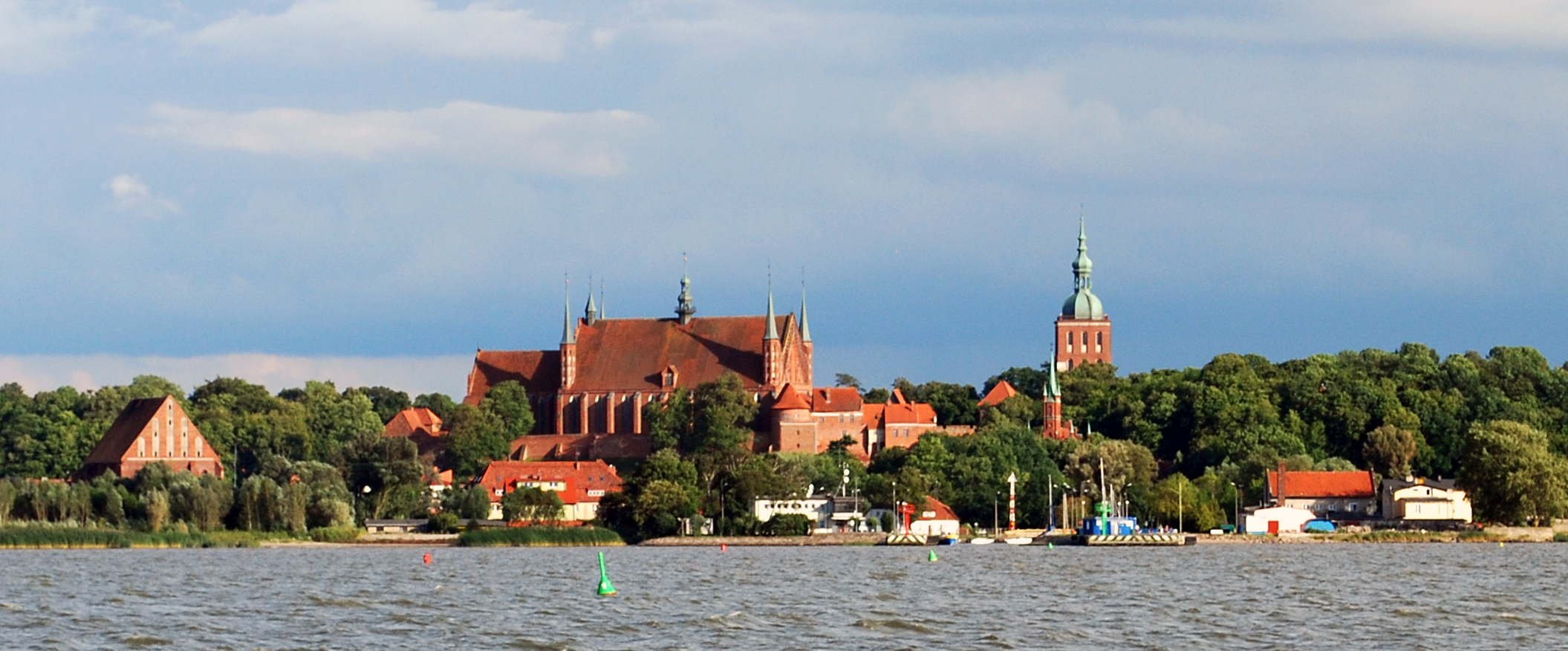
- Olsztyn Old Town Lidzbark Castle Braniewo Basilica Reszel Old Town Panorama of Frombork

- Coat of arms

- Location of Warmia (shown in red) on the map of Poland
- Country: Poland
- Voivodeship: Warmian-Masurian
- Historic capitals: Frombork, Lidzbark
- Largest city: Olsztyn

Area
  - Total: 4,500 km^{2} (1,700 sq mi)

Population
  - Total: 350,000
  - Density: 78/km^{2} (200/sq mi)
- Demonym: Warmian
- Time zone: UTC+1 (CET)
  - Summer (DST): UTC+2 (CEST)

Warmia (Polish: Warmia [ˈvarmja]; Latin: Varmia, Warmia; German: Ermland; Warmian: Warńija; Old Prussian: Wārmi) is both a historical and an ethnographic region in northern Poland, forming part of historical Prussia. Its historic capitals were Frombork and Lidzbark Warmiński and the largest city is Olsztyn.

Warmia is currently the core of the Warmian-Masurian Voivodeship (province). The region covers an area of around 4,500 km^{2} (1,700 sq mi) and has approximately 350,000 inhabitants. Important landmarks include the Cathedral Hill in Frombork, the bishops' castles at Olsztyn and Lidzbark, the medieval town of Reszel and the sanctuary in Gietrzwałd, a site of Marian apparitions. Geographically, it is an area of many lakes and lies at the upper Łyna river and on the right bank of Pasłęka, stretching in the northwest to the Vistula Bay. Warmia has a number of architectural monuments ranging from Gothic, Renaissance and Baroque to Classicism, Historicism and Art Nouveau.

Warmia is part of a larger historical region called Prussia, which was inhabited by the Old Prussians and later on was populated mainly by Germans and Poles. Warmia has traditionally strong connections with neighbouring Masuria, but it remained Catholic and belonged directly to Poland between 1454/1466 and 1772, whereas Masuria was a part of Poland as a fief held by the Teutonic Order and Ducal Prussia, which became predominantly Protestant. Warmia has been under the dominion of various states over the course of its history, most notably the Old Prussians, the Teutonic Knights, the Kingdom of Poland and the Kingdom of Prussia. The history of the region is closely connected to that of the Archbishopric of Warmia (formerly Prince-Bishopric of Warmia). The region is associated with the Prussian tribe, the Warmians, who settled in an approximate area. According to folk etymology, Warmia is named after the legendary Prussian chief Warmo, and Ermland derives from his widow Erma.

Warmia is bordered by Powiśle in the west, Masuria in the south and east, and Bartia and Natangia in the north.

== Geography ==
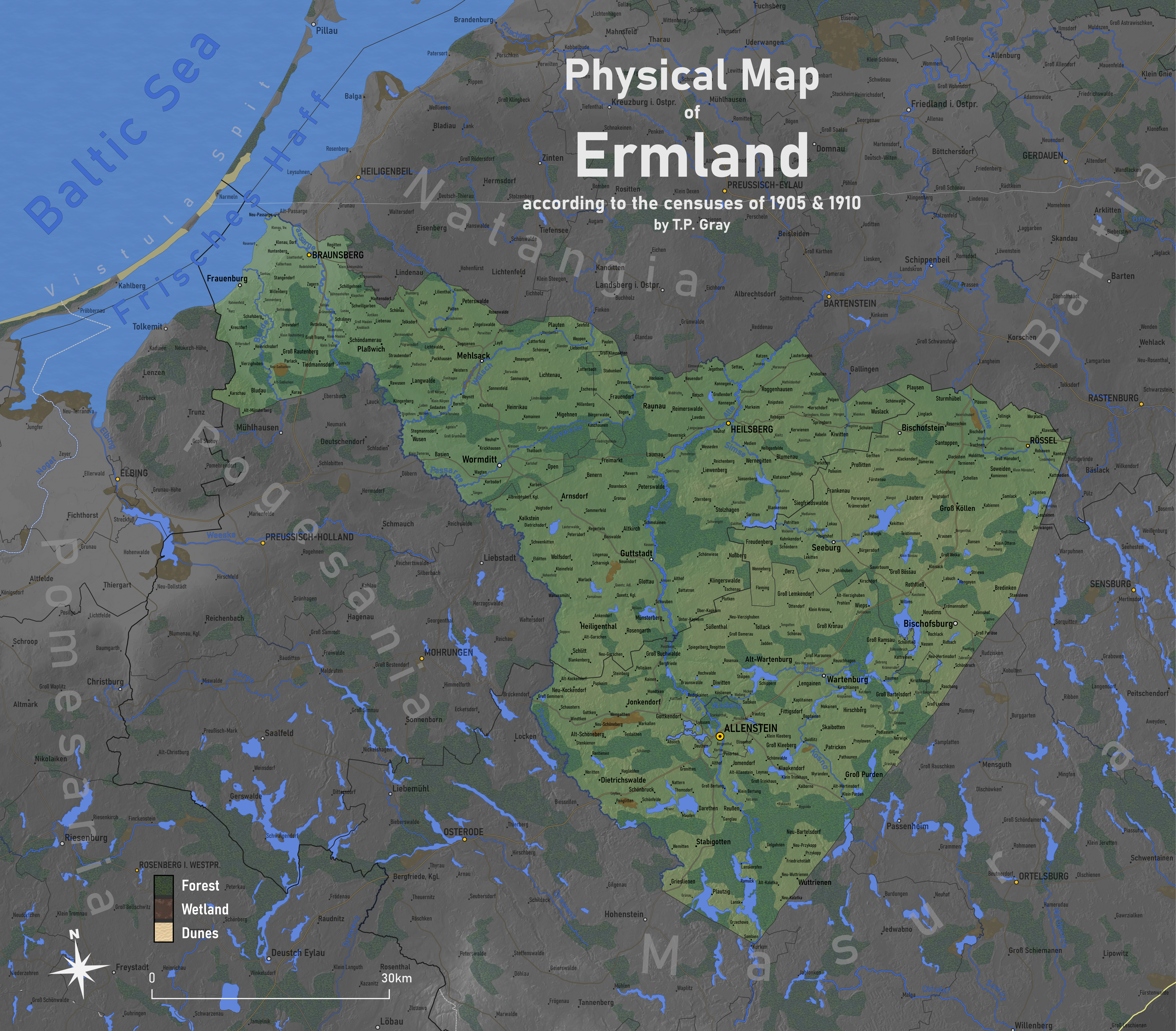
Physical map of Warmia in the year 1905

Warmia occupies a 100 kilometre long strip of land along the right bank of the Pasłęka River (German: Passarge), approximately 20 kilometres wide in the north and increasing to over 70 kilometres wide in the south. The Łyna River (German: Alle) drains the southern portion of the region, flowing to the northeast to join with the Pregolya (German: Pregel). The terrain is composed of gentle hills and wide plains, and has a humid continental climate, with milder temperatures found at lower elevations in the north near the coast.

With the exception of the far northern and southern ends of the region, the Pasłęka constitutes its western border. That river flows into the Vistula Lagoon (German: Frisches Haff) just after passing the town of Braniewo (German: Braunsberg). The historically important port town of Frombork (German: Frauenberg) lies west of the Pasłęka, near the mouth of the Bauda River. Further south, the Pasłęka is joined by the tributaries Wałsza (German: Walsch) and Drwęca Warmińska (German: Drewenz), with the headwaters of the river located near the southern end of Warmia.

The source of the Łyna river is found just south of the southern tip of the region, near the eponymous town of Łyna. The river flows through several lakes on the western end of the Masurian Lake District, passing through the cities of Olsztyn (German: Allenstein) and Lidzbark Warmiński (German: Heilsberg) as it takes in numerous tributaries on its journey north. This southern portion of Warmia is more heavily forested and historically had many towns with Polish-speaking majorities, while the rest of the region was almost entirely German-speaking prior to the flight and expulsion of the German population following the Second World War.

== History ==
=== Early times ===
Initial tribal territory of the Warmians

By the early Middle Ages, the Warmians, an Old Prussian tribe, inhabited the area.

=== Beginning of the Northern Crusades ===
In the 13th century, the area became a battleground in the Northern Crusades. Having failed to gather an expedition against Palestine, Pope Innocent III resolved in 1207 to organize a new crusade; beginning in 1209, he called for crusades against the Albigenses, against the Almohad dynasty of Spain (1213), and, also around that time, against the pagans of Prussia. The first bishop of Prussia, Christian of Oliva, was commissioned in 1209 to convert the Prussians, at the request of Konrad I of Masovia (duke from 1194 to 1247).

=== Teutonic Order ===
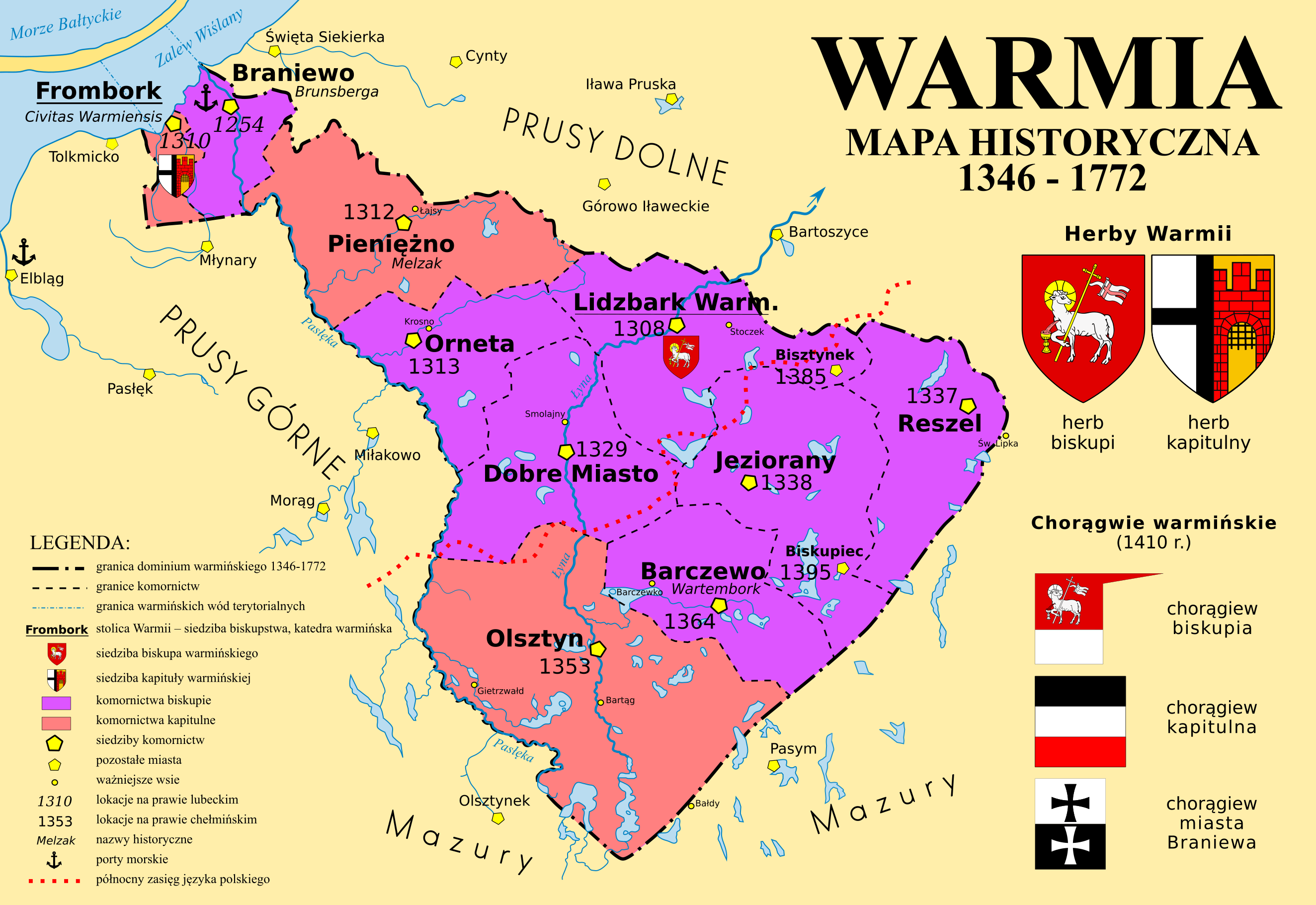
Administrative division of Warmia in 1346–1772

In 1226, Duke Konrad I of Masovia invited the Teutonic Knights to Christianize the pagan Prussians. He supplied the Teutonic Order and allowed the usage of Chełmno Land as a base for the knights. They had the task of establishing secure borders between Masovia and the Prussians, with the assumption that conquered territories would become part of Masovia. The Order waited until they received official authorisation from the Empire, which Emperor Frederick II granted by issuing the Golden Bull of Rimini (March 1226). The papal Golden Bull of Rieti from Pope Gregory IX in 1234 confirmed the grant, although Konrad of Masovia never recognized the rights of the Order to rule Prussia. Later, the Knights were accused of forging these land grants.

By the end of the 13th century, the Teutonic Order had conquered and Christianized most of the Prussian region, including Warmia. The Teutonic Order recruited mostly German-speaking settlers to develop the land. The new régime reduced many of the native Prussians to the status of serfs and gradually Germanized them.. Native Prussians were also reported as holders of estates. Over several centuries, the colonists, native Prussians and immigrants gradually intermingled. Until the early 13th century, the southern parts of Warmia were also German-speaking. Polish settlers arrived later, particularly after 1410, mainly to southern Warmia, so that German was replaced by Polish in this area.

In 1242 the papal legate William of Modena set up four dioceses, including the Archbishopric of Warmia. The bishopric was exempt and was governed by a prince-bishop, confirmed by Emperor Charles IV. The Bishops of Warmia were usually Germans or Poles, although Enea Silvio Piccolomini, the later Pope Pius II, served as an Italian bishop of the diocese.

After the Battle of Grunwald of 1410, Bishop Heinrich Heilsberg von Vogelsang of Warmia surrendered to King Władysław II Jagiełło of Poland, and later with Bishop Henry of Sambia paid homage to the Polish king at the Polish camp during the siege of Marienburg Castle (Malbork). After the Polish army moved out of Warmia, the new Grand Master of the Teutonic Knights, Heinrich von Plauen the Elder, accused the bishop of treachery and reconquered the region.

=== Kingdom of Poland ===
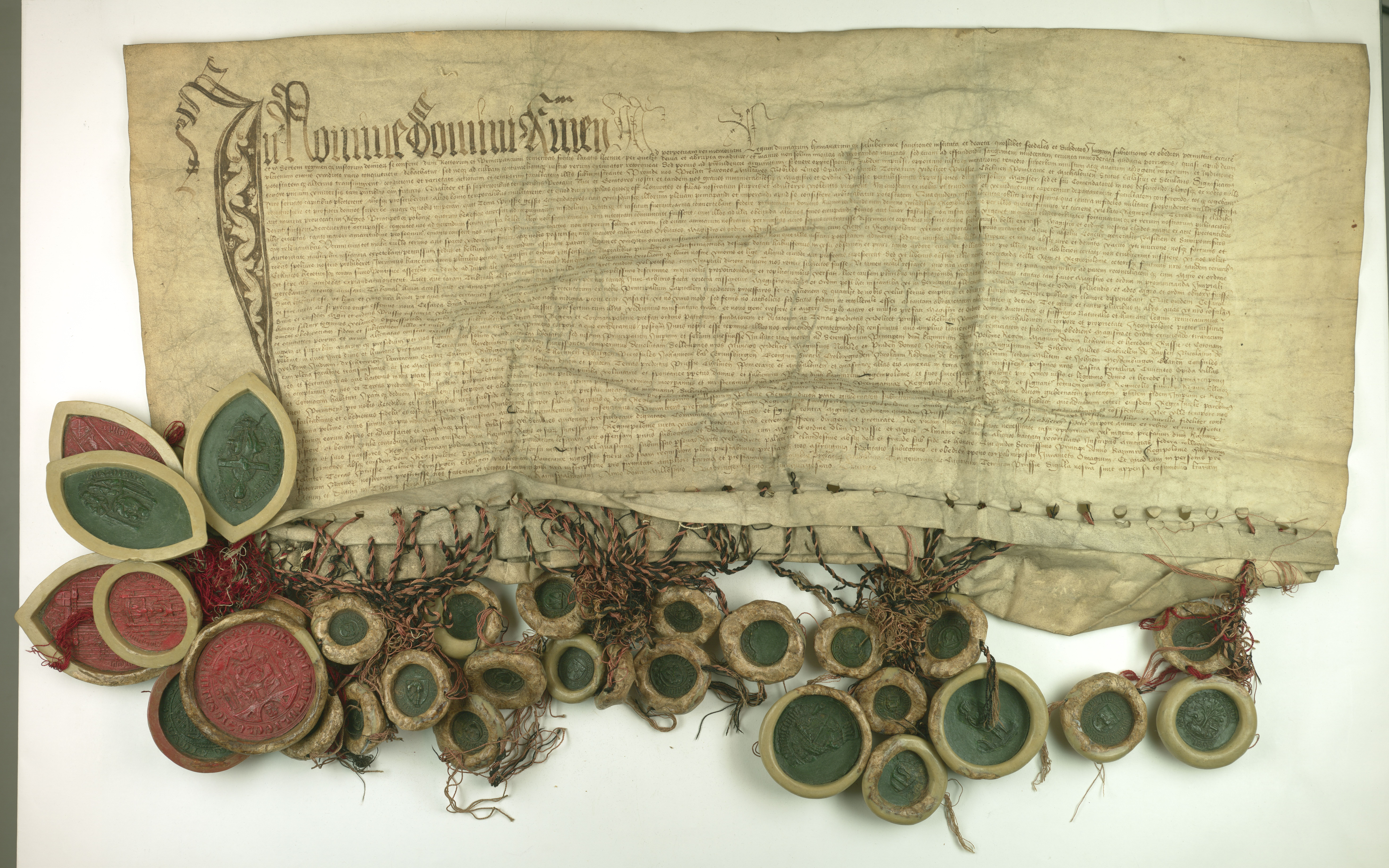
Act of incorporation of the region into the Kingdom of Poland, 1454

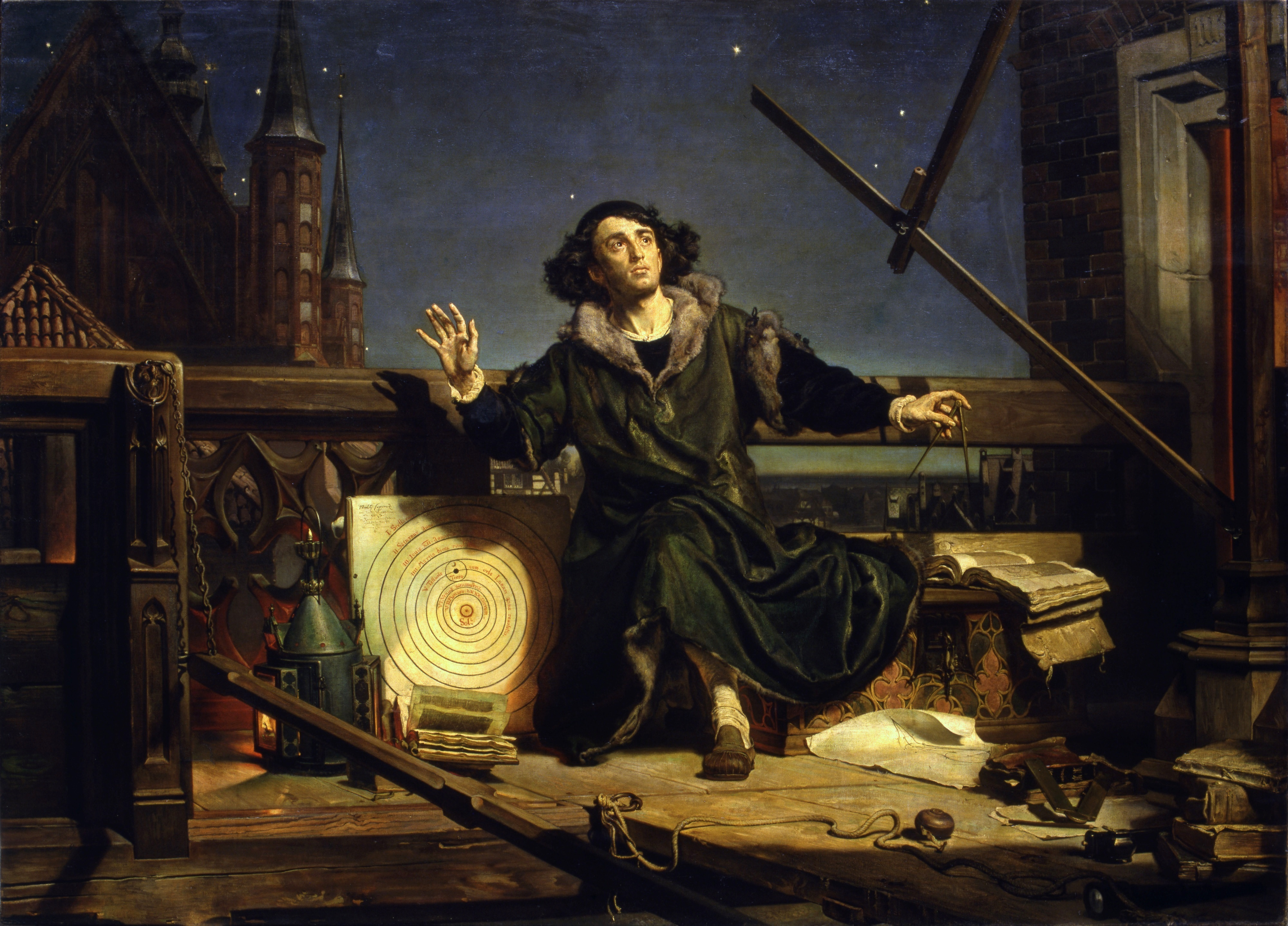
Nicolaus Copernicus, Warmian Cathedral Chapter canon and famous astronomer, with the Frombork Cathedral in the background, on a painting by Jan Matejko

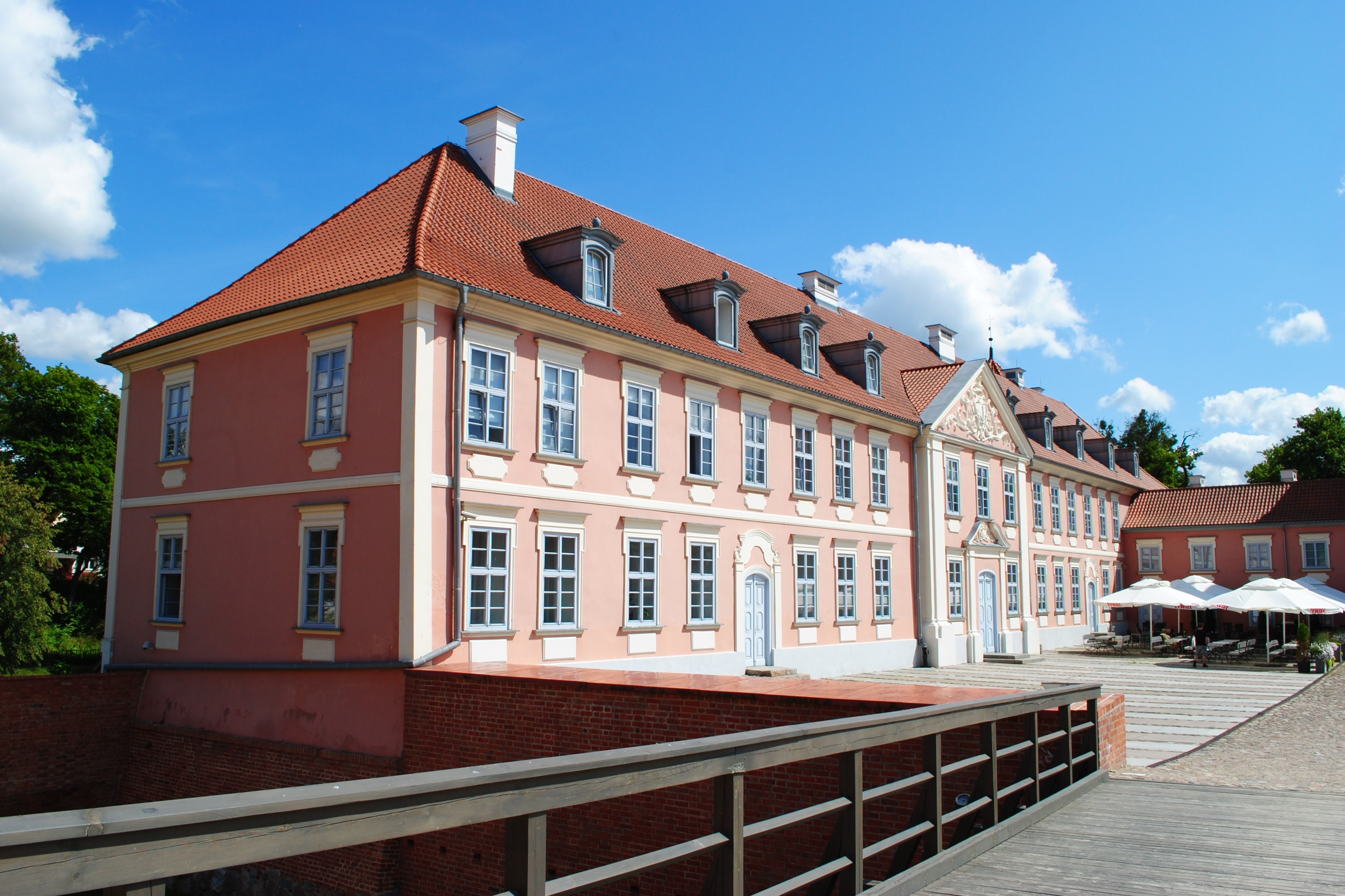
The Grabowski Palace in Lidzbark Warmiński, the capital of Warmia until the Partitions of Poland

In February 1440, the nobility of Warmia and the town of Braniewo (Braunsberg) co-founded the Prussian Confederation, which opposed Teutonic rule, and most towns of Warmia joined the league in May 1440. In February 1454, the confederacy asked Polish King Casimir IV Jagiellon to incorporate the region to the Kingdom of Poland, to which the king agreed and signed the act of incorporation in Kraków on 6 March 1454, and the Thirteen Years' War (1454–1466) broke out. During the war Warmia was recaptured by the Teutonic Knights, however, in 1464 Bishop Paweł Legendorf vel Mgowski sided with Poland and the Prince-Bishopric came again under the overlordship of the Polish King. In the Second Peace of Thorn (1466) the Teutonic Knights renounced any claims to Warmia, and recognized Polish sovereignty over the region, which was confirmed to be part of Poland. It remained administratively a Prince-Bishopric with several privileges, part of the larger provinces of Royal Prussia and Greater Poland Province.

Soon after, in 1467, the Cathedral Chapter elected Nicolas von Tüngen against the wish of the Polish king. The Estates of Royal Prussia did not take the side of the Cathedral Chapter. Nicholas von Tüngen allied himself with the Teutonic Order and with King Matthias Corvinus of Hungary. The feud, known as the War of the Priests, was a low scale affair, affecting mainly Warmia. In 1478, Braniewo (Braunsberg) withstood a Polish siege which was ended in an agreement in which the Polish king recognized von Tüngen as bishop and the right of the Cathedral Chapter to elect future bishops, which however would have to be accepted by the king, and the bishop as well as Cathedral Chapter swore an oath to the Polish king. Later in the Treaty of Piotrków Trybunalski (7 December 1512), conceded to the king of Poland a limited right to determine the election of bishops by choosing four candidates from Royal Prussia. The region retained autonomy, governing itself and maintaining its own laws, customs, rights and German language.

Warmia was invaded by the Teutonic Knights during the Polish–Teutonic War of 1519–1521; however, the Poles, led by renowned astronomer Nicolaus Copernicus, repulsed the Teutonic siege of Olsztyn in 1521. Copernicus spent more than half of his life in Warmia, where he wrote many of his groundbreaking works and conducted astronomical observations and mathematical calculations, which became the basis for his heliocentric model of the universe. After the war of 1519–1521, he coordinated the reconstruction and resettlement of the devastated southern Warmia.

In 1565, Cardinal Stanislaus Hosius founded the Collegium Hosianum in Braniewo, which became the leading institution of higher learning in the region.

After the Union of Lublin in 1569, the Prince-Bishopric of Warmia was integrated more directly into the Polish Crown within the Polish–Lithuanian Commonwealth. At the same time, the territory continued to enjoy substantial autonomy, with many legal differences from neighbouring lands. For example, the bishops were by law members of Polish Senat and the land elected MP's to the Sejmik of Royal Prussia as well as MP's to the Sejm of Poland.

Warmia was under the Church jurisdiction of the Archbishopric of Riga until 1512, when Prince-Bishop Lucas Watzenrode received exempt status, placing Warmia directly under the authority of the Pope (in terms of church jurisdiction), which remained until the resolution of the Holy Roman Empire in 1806.

=== Prussia and Germany ===
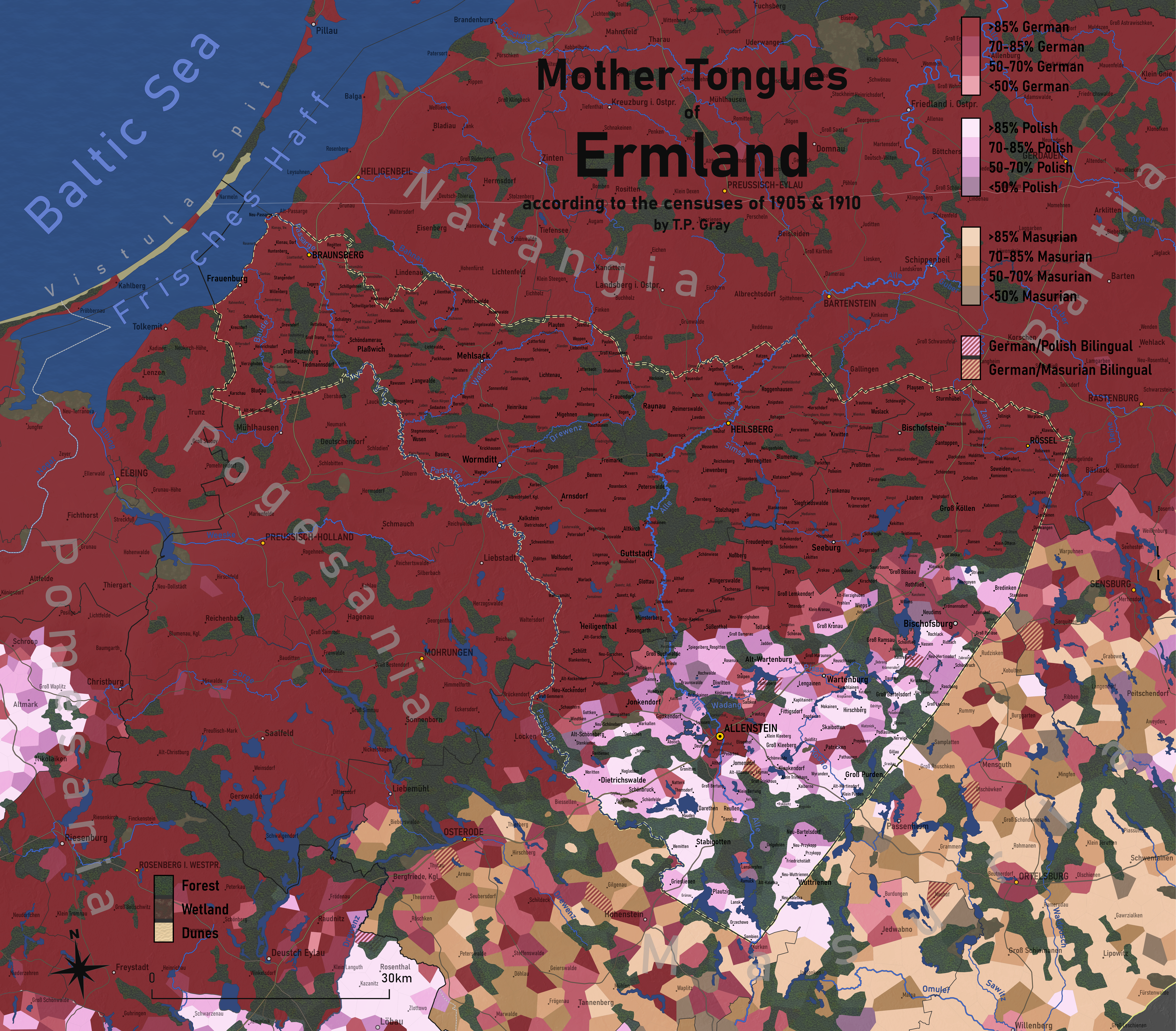
Mother tongues and religious confessions of Warmia, 1905/1910

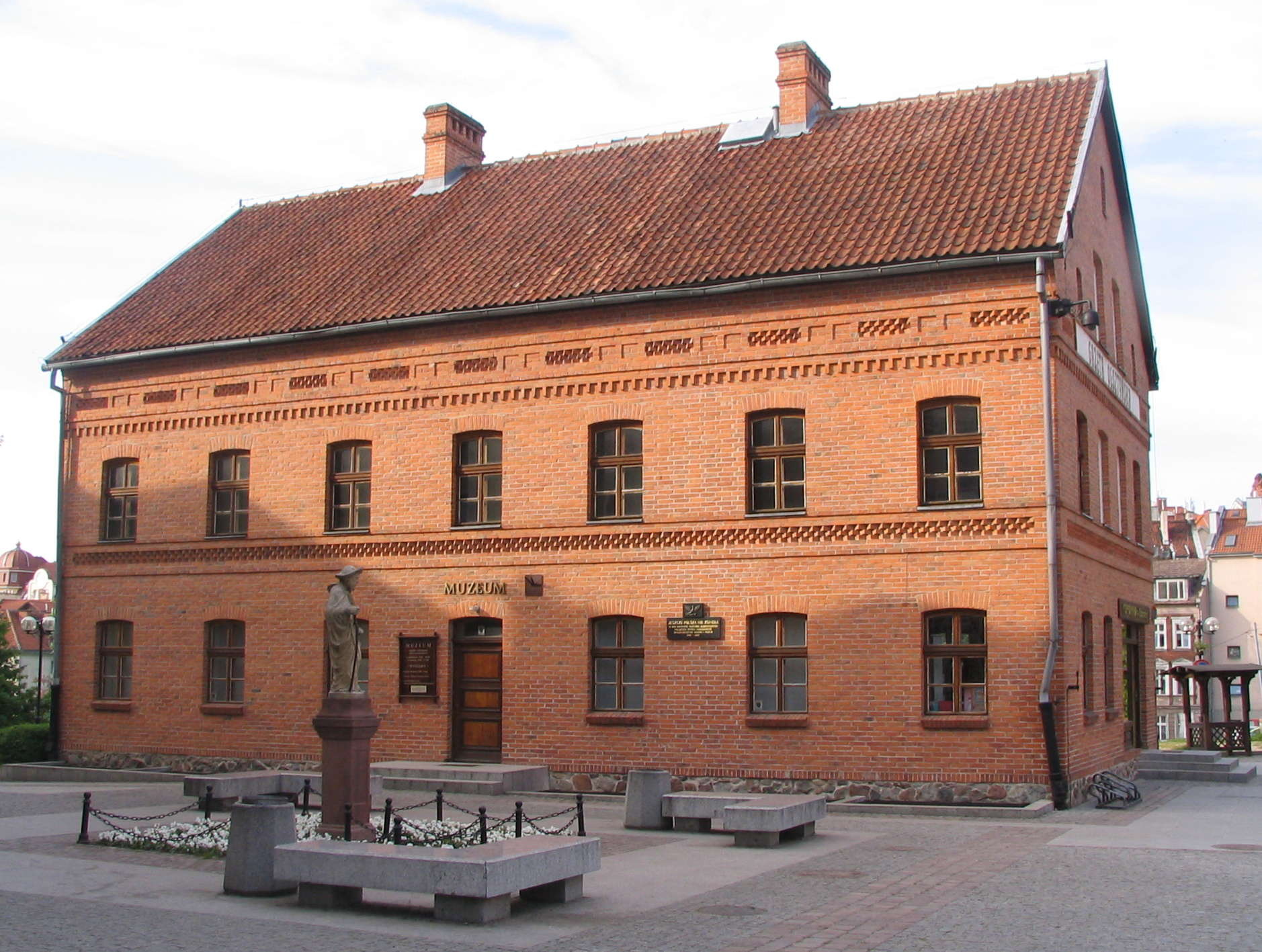
Former headquarters of the pre-war Polish newspaper Gazeta Olsztyńska in Olsztyn, destroyed by the Germans in 1939, rebuilt in 1989, now a museum

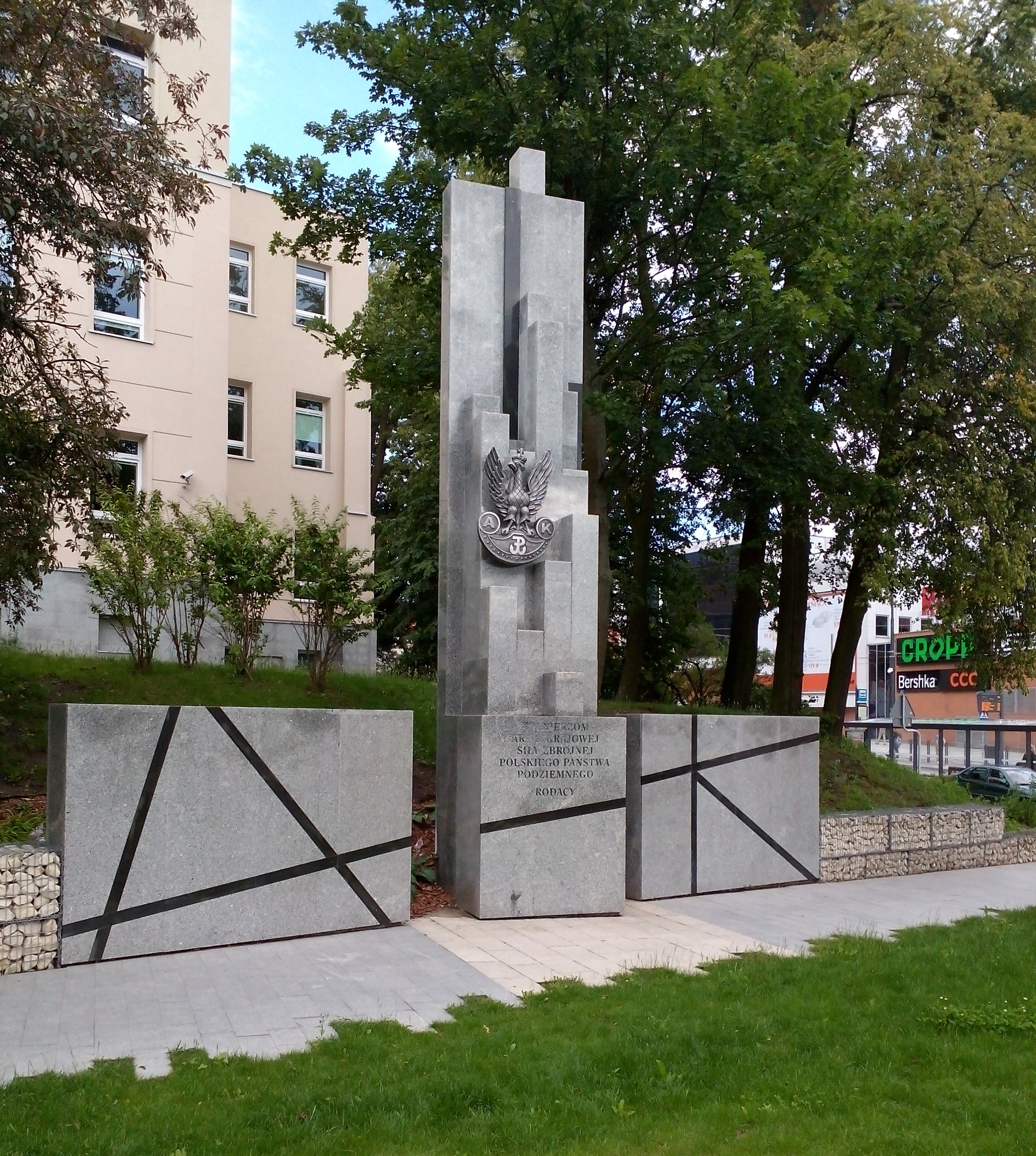
Home Army Monument in Olsztyn

By the First Partition of Poland in 1772, Warmia was annexed by the Kingdom of Prussia; the properties of the Archbishopric of Warmia were secularized by the Prussian state. In 1773, Warmia was merged with the surrounding areas into the newly established province of East Prussia. Ignacy Krasicki, the last prince-bishop of Warmia as well as Enlightenment Polish poet, friend of Frederick the Great (whom he did not give homage as his new king), was nominated to the Archbishopric of Gniezno (and thus Primate of Poland) in 1795. After the last partition of Poland and during his tenure as Primate of Poland and Prussian subject, he was ordered by Pope Pius VI to teach his Catholic Poles to 'stay obedient, faithful, and loving to their new kings', Papal brief of 1795. The Prussian census in 1772 showed a total population of 96,547, including an urban population of 24,612 in 12 towns. 17,749 houses were listed and the biggest city was Braunsberg (Braniewo).

Between 1773 and 1945, Warmia was part of the predominantly Lutheran province of East Prussia, with the exception that the people of Warmia remained largely Catholic. Most of the population of Warmia spoke High Prussian German, while a small area in the north spoke Low Prussian German; southern Warmia was populated by both Germans and Polish Warmiaks. The Polish population was subjected to intense Germanisation policies. Warmia was divided into four districts (Kreise) - Allenstein (Olsztyn), Rössel (Reszel), Heilsberg (Lidzbark Warmiński) and Braunsberg (Braniewo). The city of Allenstein was separated from the Allenstein district in 1910 and became an independent city.

On 6 May 1863, the village of Bredynki was the site of a massacre of Polish inhabitants. Local farmers protested the taking of the lake from the village and handing it over to a local miller. Prussian troops fired on the crowd, killing more than a dozen people, including women, and wounding 30.

In the winter of 1863–1864, Polish insurgents of the January Uprising who fled the Russian Partition of Poland, found shelter in Warmia.

Ethnolinguistic structure of Southern Warmian districts (1825, 1910)
Year	District	Population	German		Polish / Bilingual	
Year	District	Population	Number	Percent	Number	Percent
1825	Allenstein (city)	2,637	1,371	52.0%	1,266	48.0%
1825	Allenstein (district)	27,820	3,556	12.8%	24,264	87.2%
1825	Rössel	30,705	23,927	77.9%	6,778	22.1%
1825	Total	61,162	28,854	47.2%	32,308	52.8%
1910	Allenstein (city)	33,077	29,344	88.7%	3,683	11.1%
1910	Allenstein (district)	57,919	22,825	39.4%	35,079	60.6%
1910	Rössel	50,472	43,189	85.6%	7,283	14.4%
1910	Total	141,468	95,358	67.4%	46,045	32.5%

In 1871, along with the rest of East Prussia, Warmia became part of the German Empire. In 1873, according to a regulation of the Imperial German government, school lessons at public schools inside Germany had to be held in German; as a result, the Polish language was forbidden in all schools in Warmia, including Polish schools already founded in the sixteenth century. In 1900, Warmia's population was 240,000. In the jingoistic climate after World War I, Warmian Poles were subject to persecution by the German government. Polish children speaking their language were punished in schools and often had to wear signs with insulting names, such as "Polack".

After the First World War, Poland regained independence, and a plebiscite was held to determine the future of Warmia. In February 1920, Poland opened a consulate in Olsztyn in 1920, however, due to the German persecution of Poles and the advances of the Red Army towards Warsaw in the Polish–Soviet War in 1920, the plebiscite resulted in a German victory, and the region remained within Germany in the interbellum.

Despite German hostility, the Poles founded numerous Polish organizations in Warmia in the interbellum. Persecution of Poles intensified after the Nazi Party rose to power in Germany. Due to severe persecution, from 1936, Polish organizations carried out their activities partly in conspiracy. Polish organizations were heavily invigilated by the Sicherheitspolizei (German security police) through its undercover agents, known as the Vertrauensmänner. Based on their information, the German police compiled files and lists of Poles who were supposed to be either executed or imprisoned in Nazi concentration camps. Nazi militants carried out attacks on Polish schools, organizations, printshops and shops. The persecution of Poles further intensified in 1939. In early 1939, many Polish activists were expelled. Afterwards, in an attempt to rig the results of an upcoming census and understate the number of Poles in the region, the Germans terrorized the Polish population, attacked Polish schools and organizations, and confiscated Polish pre-census information leaflets. In summer 1939, the German terror against the Poles even exceeded the terror from the period of the 1920 plebiscite. Poles were subjected to expulsions and arrests, there were terrorist attacks on Polish organizations and schools, Polish libraries were looted or destroyed, and entire volumes of Polish press were confiscated. In August 1939, Germany introduced martial law in the region, which allowed for even more blatant persecution of Poles. Germany co-formed the Einsatzgruppe V in Olsztyn, which then committed various atrocities against Poles during the German invasion of Poland that began World War II in September 1939. In August and September 1939, the Germans carried out mass arrests of Poles, including activists, teachers, school principals, bank employees, newspaper editors, entrepreneurs, priests, scout leaders, and the consul and employees of the Polish Consulate in Olsztyn, and shut down or seized Polish newspapers and libraries. Arrested Poles were mostly deported to concentration camps, incl. Hohenbruch, Soldau, Stutthof, Sachsenhausen, Gusen and Ravensbrück. During World War II, many Poles from the region were forcibly conscripted into the Wehrmacht. The German Nazi government operated a notable Nazi prison in the town of Barczewo (Wartenburg) with several forced labour subcamps in the region. The Polish resistance movement was active in the region and Polish underground press was distributed.

=== Polish Republic ===
Following Germany's defeat in World War II, and the Yalta Conference and Potsdam Conference of 1945, Warmia was reintegrated into Poland, pending a final peace conference with Germany, which eventually never took place. The German inhabitants either fled or were transferred to Germany by Soviet and communist authorities installed in Poland and the remaining Polish inhabitants were joined by Polish settlers, many of whom were displaced from former eastern Poland annexed by the Soviet Union.

Olsztyn is the largest city in Warmia and the capital of the Warmian-Masurian Voivodeship. During 1945–1946, Warmia was part of the Masurian District. In 1946, a new voivodeship was created and named the Olsztyn Voivodeship, which encompassed both Warmia and Masurian counties. From 1975 to 1998, Warmia was divided between the Olsztyn and Elbląg Voivodeships, and in 1999 it was entirely included with the Warmian-Masurian Voivodeship. The Catholic character of Warmia has been preserved in the architecture of its villages and towns, as well as in folk customs.

== Anthem ==
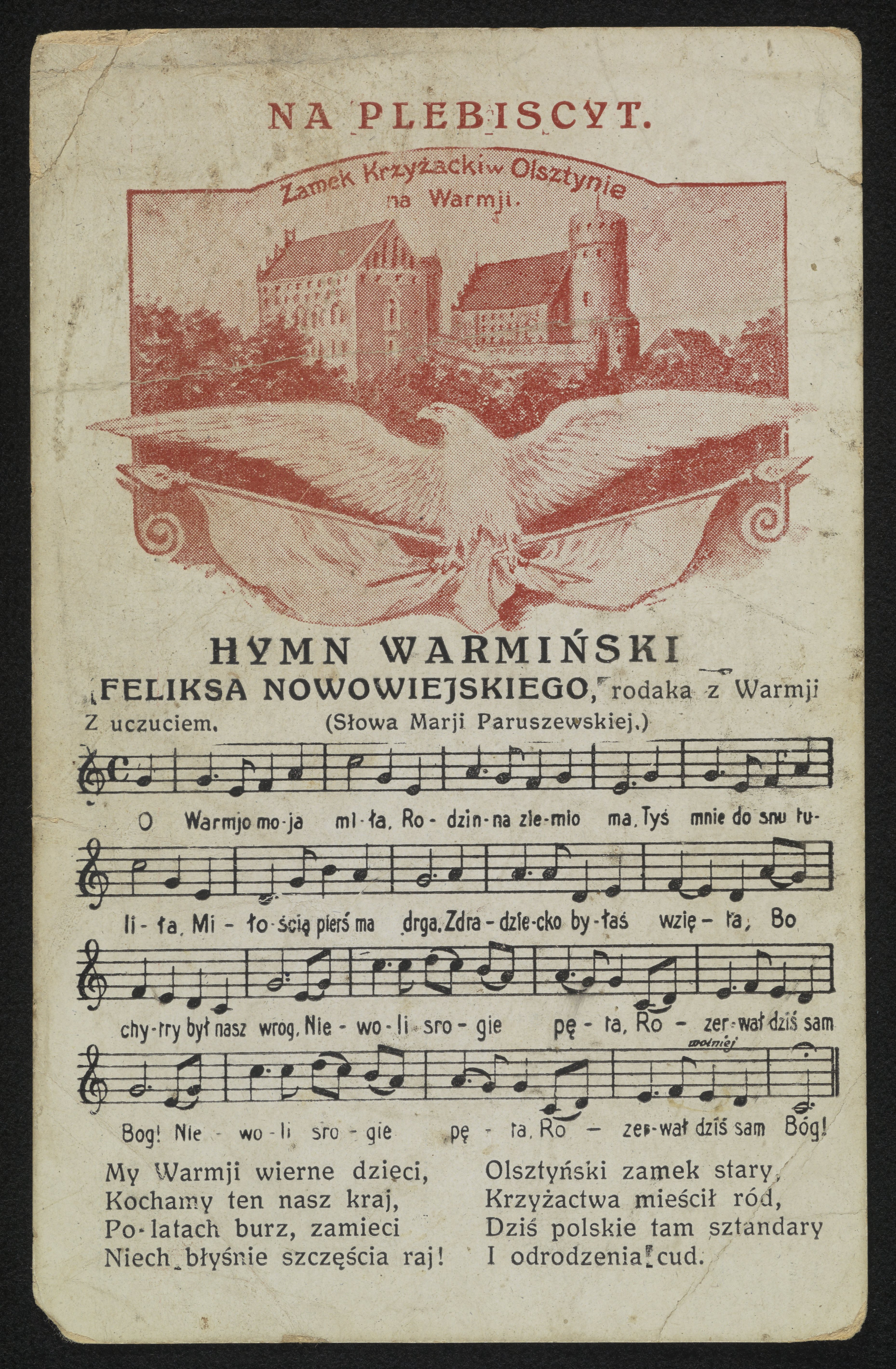
"Anthem of Warmia" by Feliks Nowowiejski, print from 1920

The unofficial anthem of Warmia is O Warmio moja miła from 1920, with music by local Polish composer Feliks Nowowiejski and lyrics by Maria Paruszewska. It is also the bugle call of the region's largest city, Olsztyn.

== Sights ==
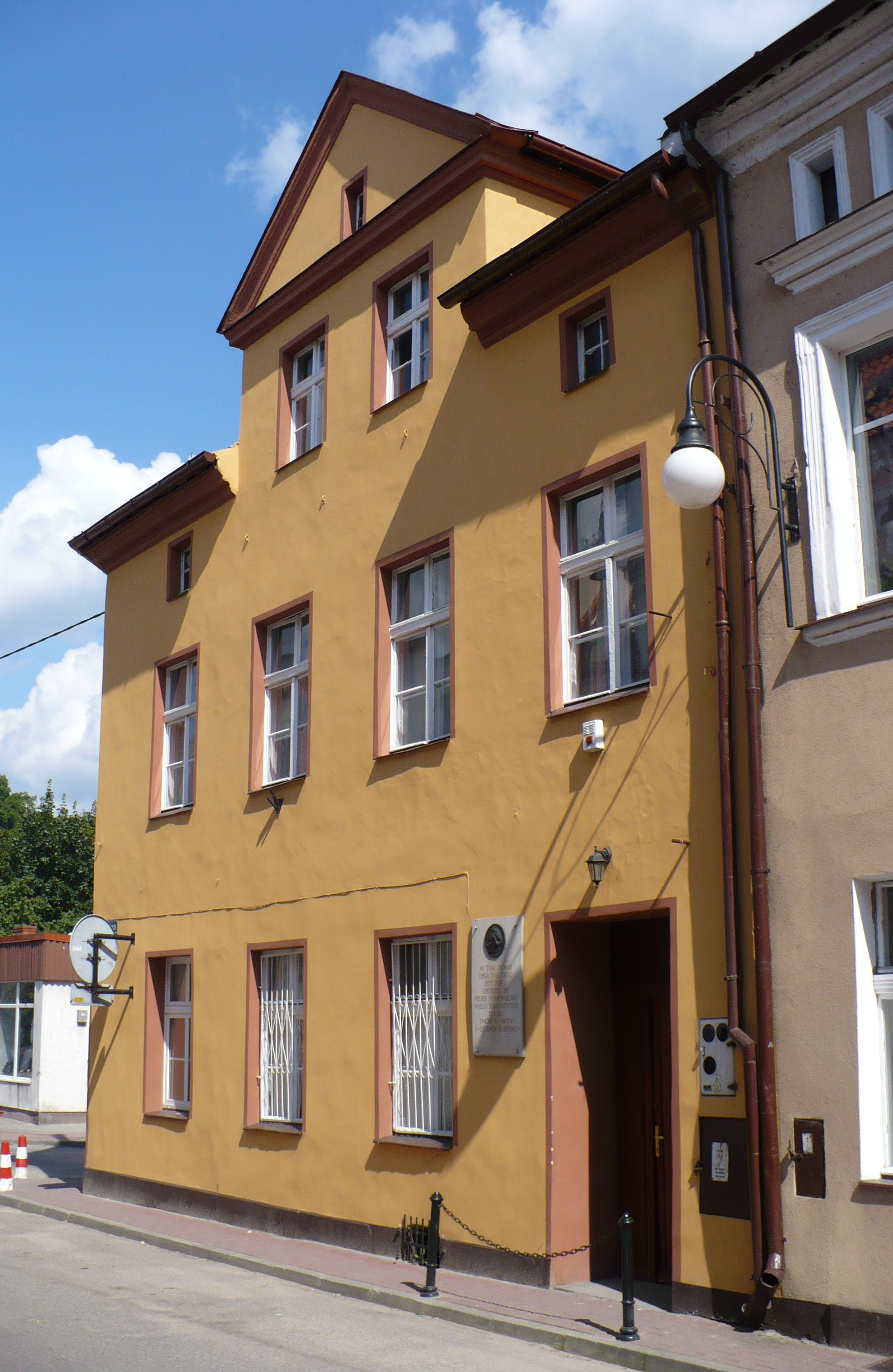
Feliks Nowowiejski Museum in Barczewo

Three landmarks in Warmia are listed as Historic Monuments of Poland:

- Gothic Archcathedral Basilica of the Assumption of the Blessed Virgin Mary and St. Andrew in Frombork with its fortifications and the Copernicus Tower
- Gothic Castle of the Warmian Bishops in Lidzbark Warmiński
- Baroque Sanctuary of Saint Mary in Stoczek Klasztorny

Other sights include the old towns of Olsztyn and Reszel with the Reszel and Olsztyn castles, the Old Town of Barczewo with the museum of Polish composer Feliks Nowowiejski at his birthplace. There are also several palaces, including the Baroque Grabowski Palace in Lidzbark Warmiński and the palace in Smolajny, the favorite summer residence of the leading Polish Enlightenment poet Ignacy Krasicki. The Basilica of the Nativity of the Virgin Mary in Gietrzwałd is a popular regional pilgrimage site.

Places of stay of Nicolaus Copernicus include the medieval castles in Olsztyn, Lidzbark Warmiński and Pieniężno, whereas the Frombork Cathedral contains his grave and epitaph.

A typical feature of the Warmian landscape is the massive Gothic churches in the towns and the numerous historic wayside shrines in various towns and villages, a reminder of the region's strong Catholic traditions.

There is a small cemetery of the Commonwealth War Graves Commission in Markajmy at which British and Commonwealth prisoners-of-war of Germany from World War I are buried.

== Cuisine ==
In addition to traditional nationwide Polish cuisine, Warmia has its own regional and local traditional foods and beverages, as designated by the Ministry of Agriculture and Rural Development of Poland.

Unique local dishes include the Lord-style turkey wings (Skrzydła indycze po pańsku). Ignacy Krasicki is considered one of the pioneers of turkey meat consumption in Warmia, as already in 1791, during a feast he organized, he ordered turkey to be served, among other dishes.

The tradition of producing Warmian smoked beef ham (Warmińska szynka wołowa wędzona) is cultivated by several meat-packing plants in Warmia.

The officially protected traditional alcoholic beverages of Warmia are Okowita miodowa warmińska, a beverage of 42% alcohol by volume made from Warmian honey, and the Warmian porter, a local type of Polish beer.

The traditional cuisine of German Warmiaks includes Königsberger Klopse, Heilsberger Keilchen, a form of potato dumplings, and Wruken (turnip), or Klunkersuppe (flour milk soup) mit Bratschukken (fried potatoes).

== Sports ==
The most accomplished sports team of Warmia is AZS Olsztyn, multiple times Polish volleyball champions and Polish Cup winners. The first several tournaments of the Memorial of Hubert Jerzy Wagner, an international volleyball friendly competition, were held in Warmia.

== Cities and towns ==
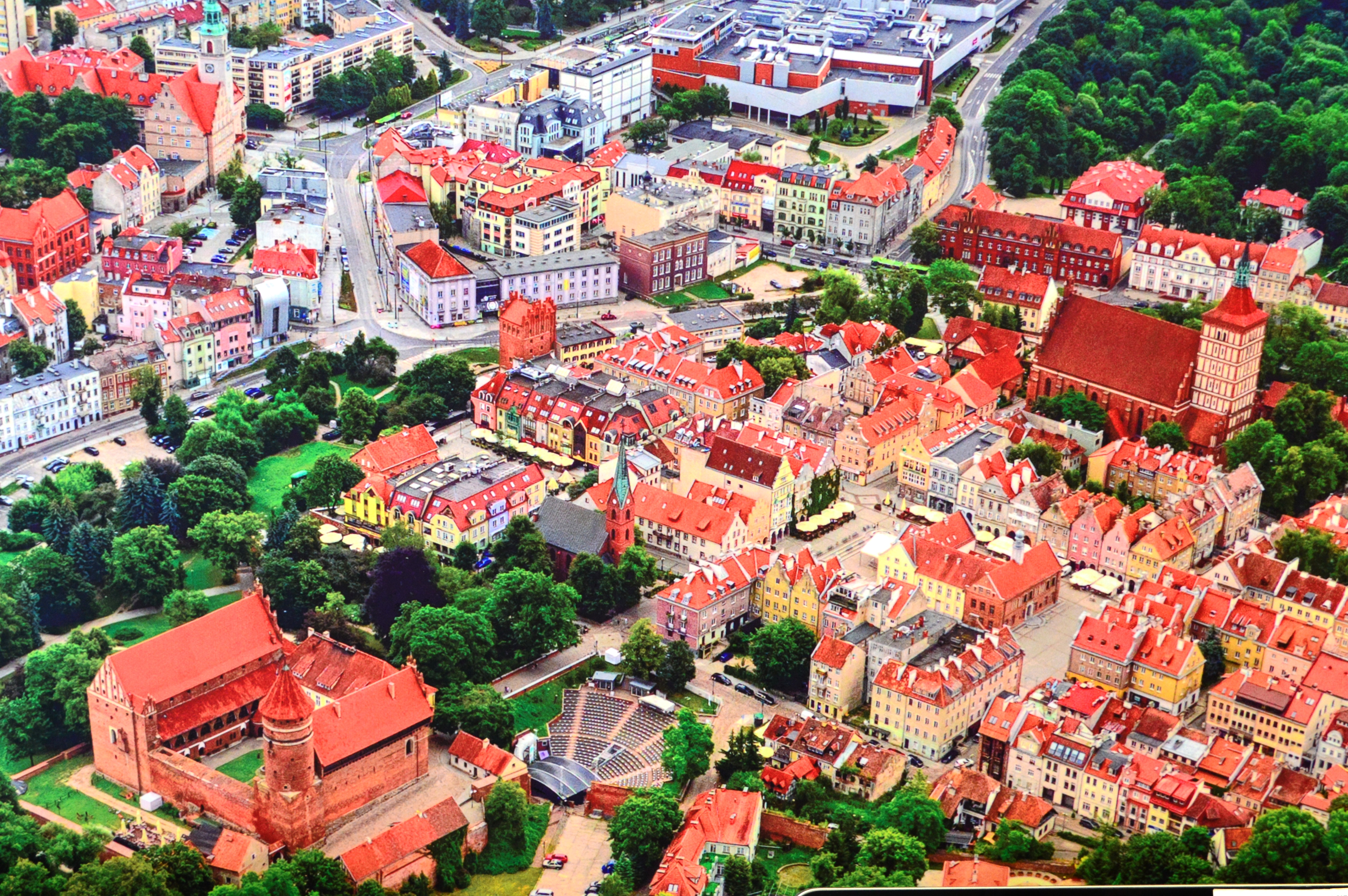
Olsztyn is the largest city of Warmia and capital of the Warmian-Masurian Voivodeship

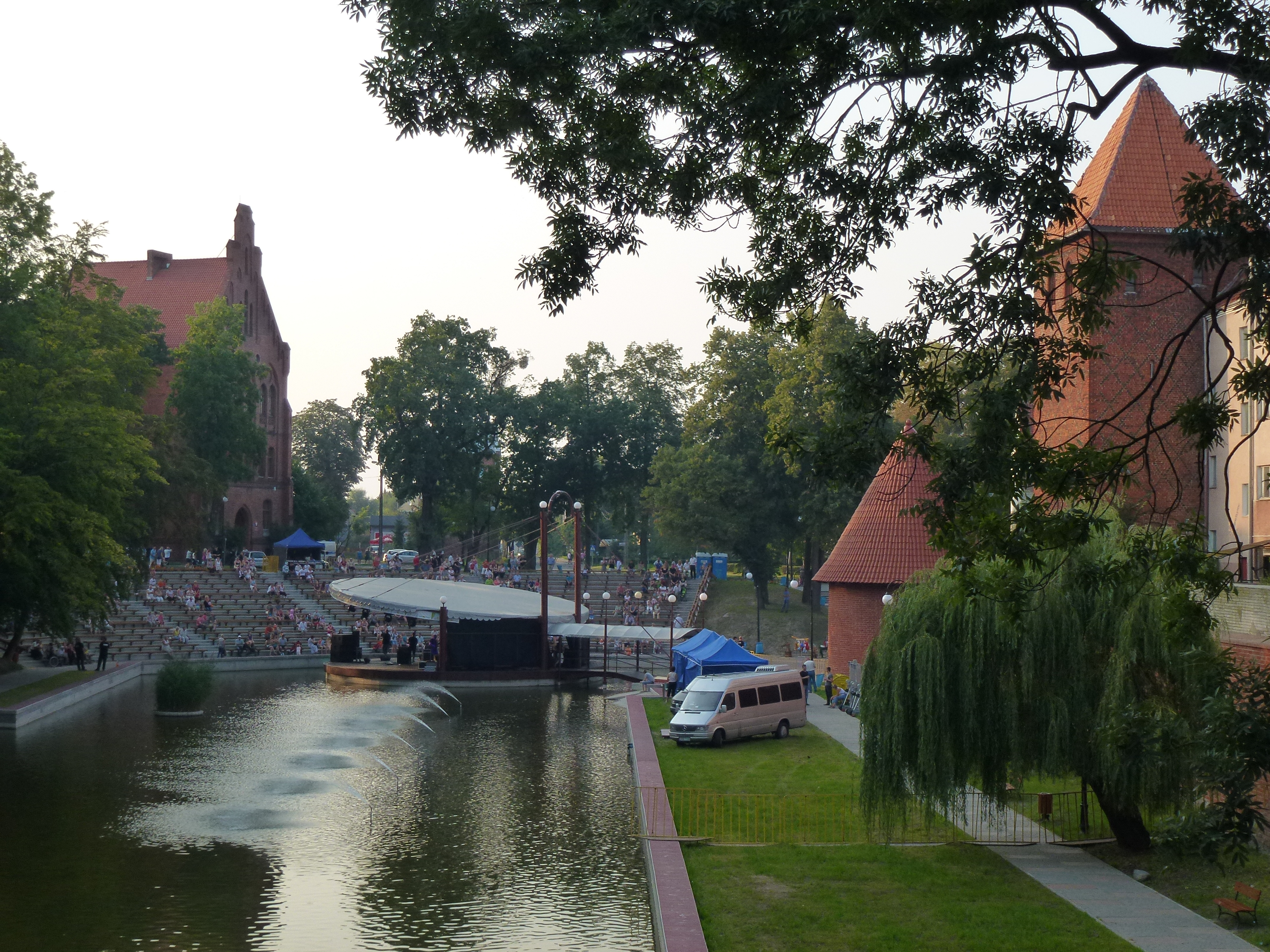
Braniewo is the northernmost town of Warmia

	City	Population (2015)	Granted city rights
1.	Olsztyn	174,675	1353
2.	Braniewo	17,385	1254
3.	Lidzbark Warmiński	16,352	1308
4.	Biskupiec	10,626	1395
5.	Dobre Miasto	10,599	1329
6.	Orneta	9,046	1313
7.	Barczewo	7,265	1364
8.	Reszel	4,817	1337
9.	Jeziorany	3,346	1338
10.	Pieniężno	2,949	1312
11.	Bisztynek	2,492	1385
12.	Frombork	2,475	1310

== Gallery ==
Castles of Warmian Bishops

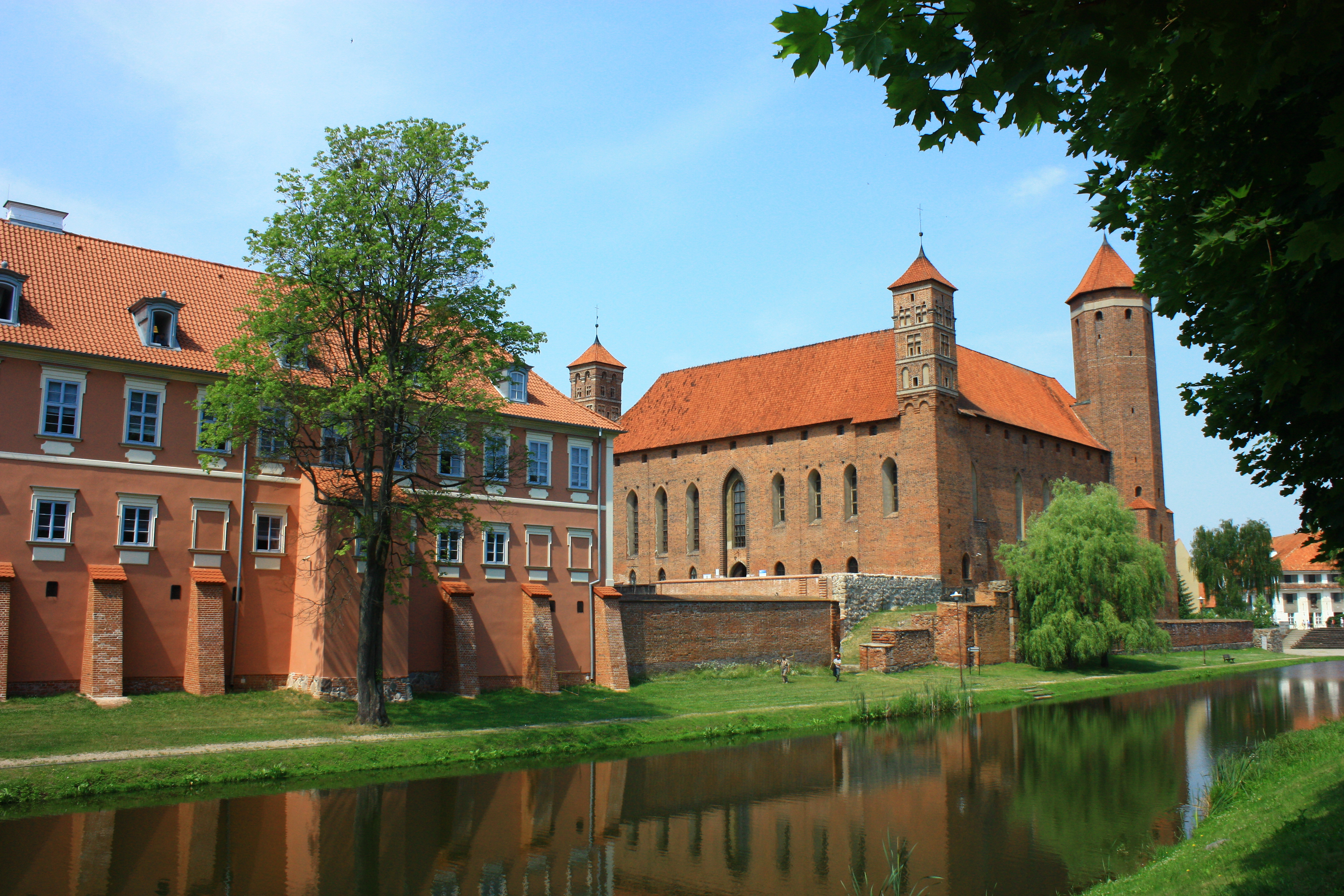
Lidzbark Warmiński Castle

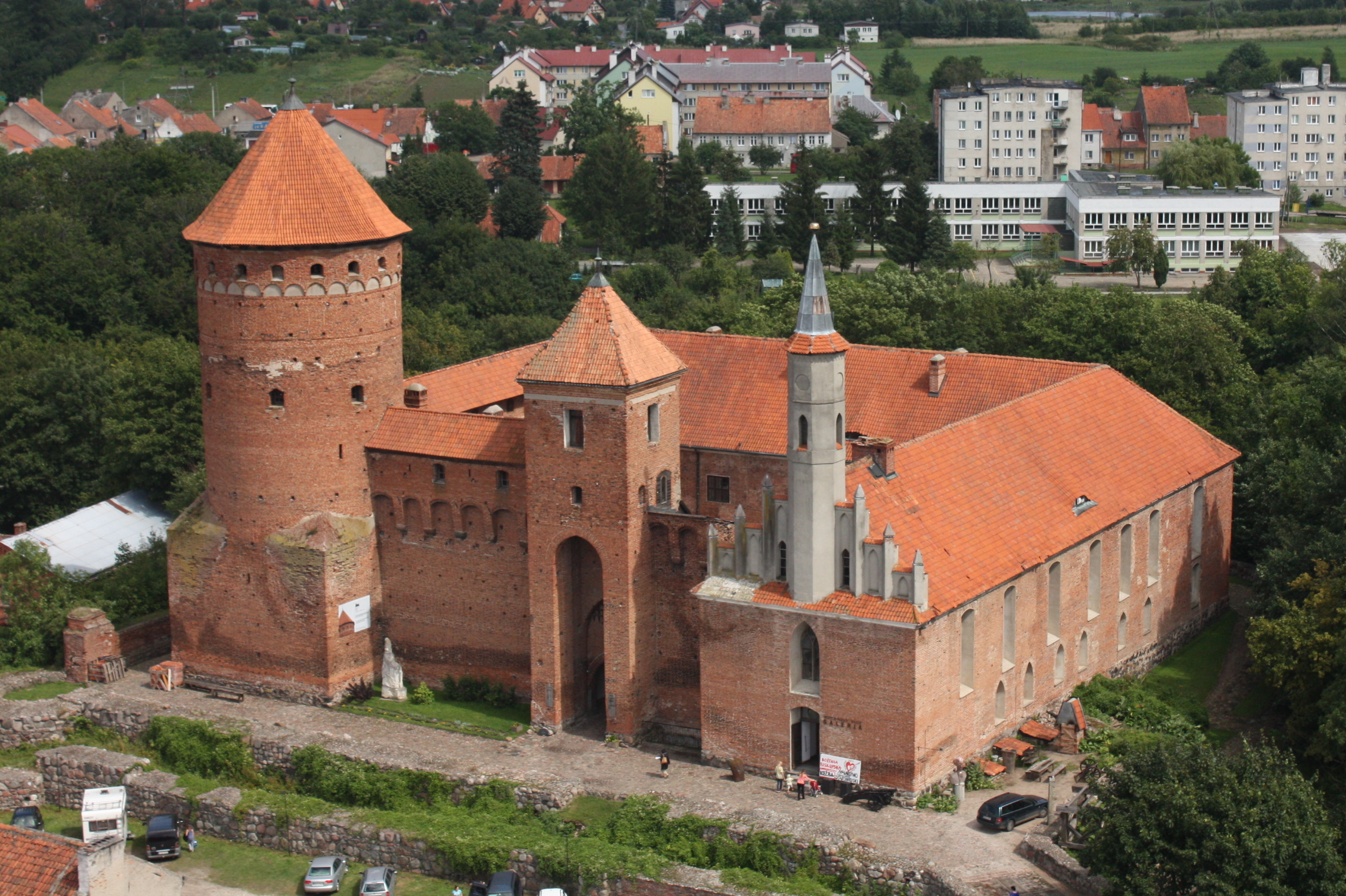
Reszel Castle

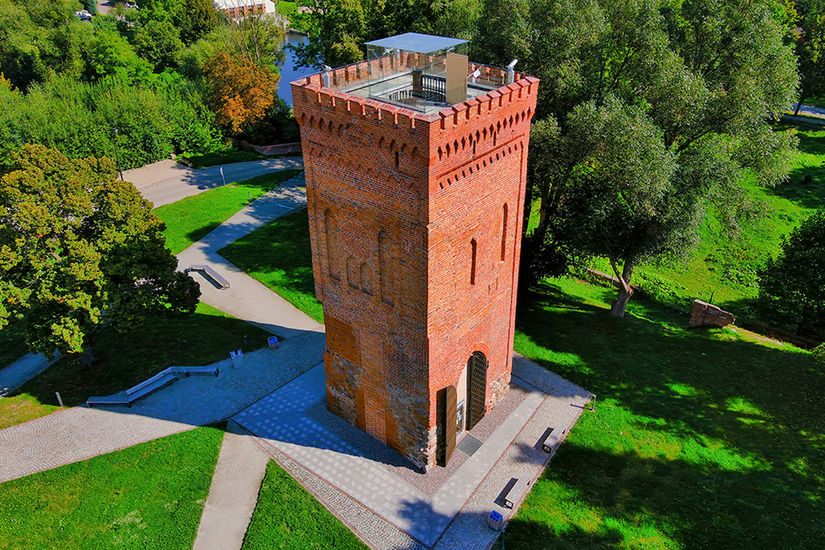
Remains of the Braniewo Castle
Castles of Warmian Cathedral Chapter

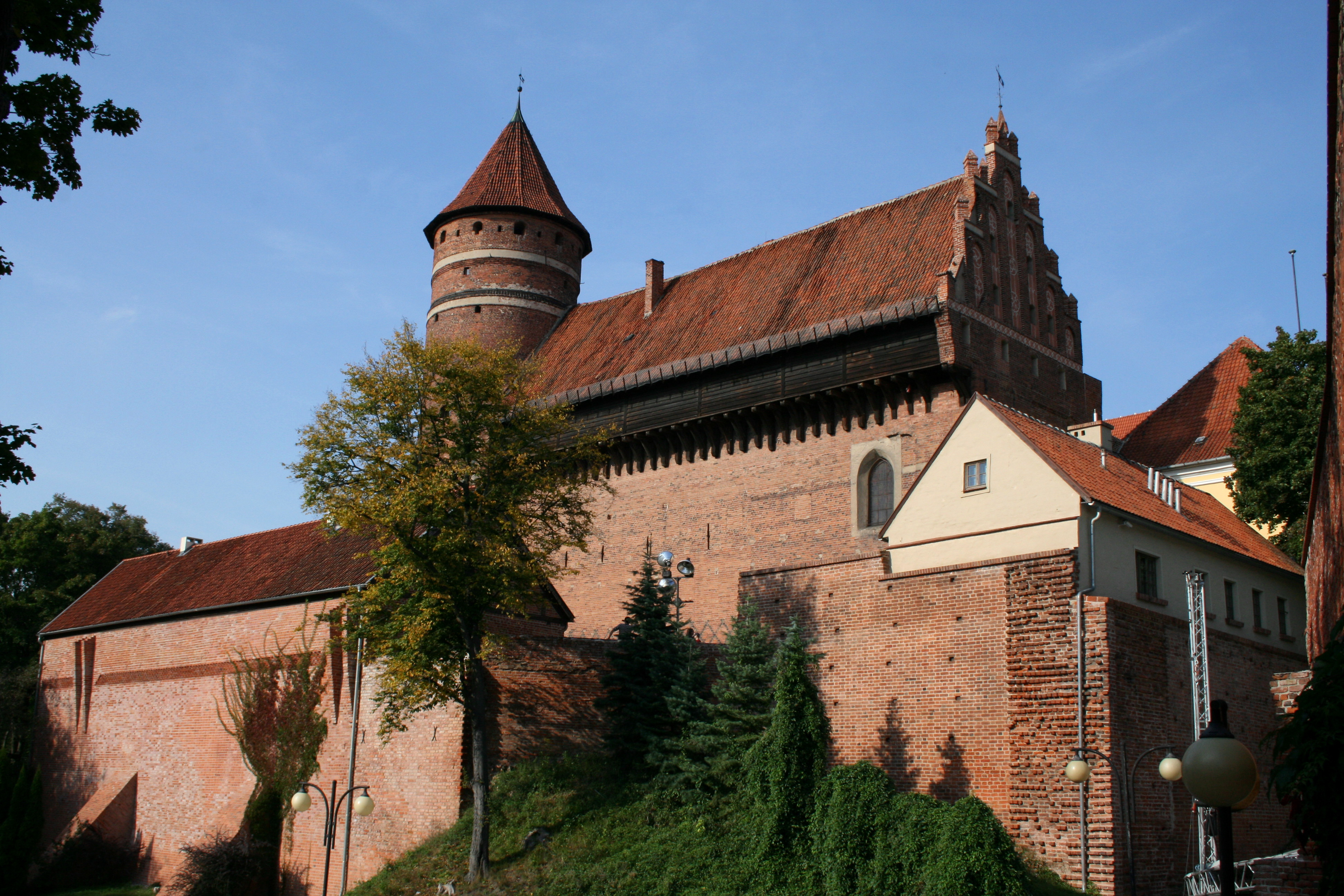
Olsztyn Castle

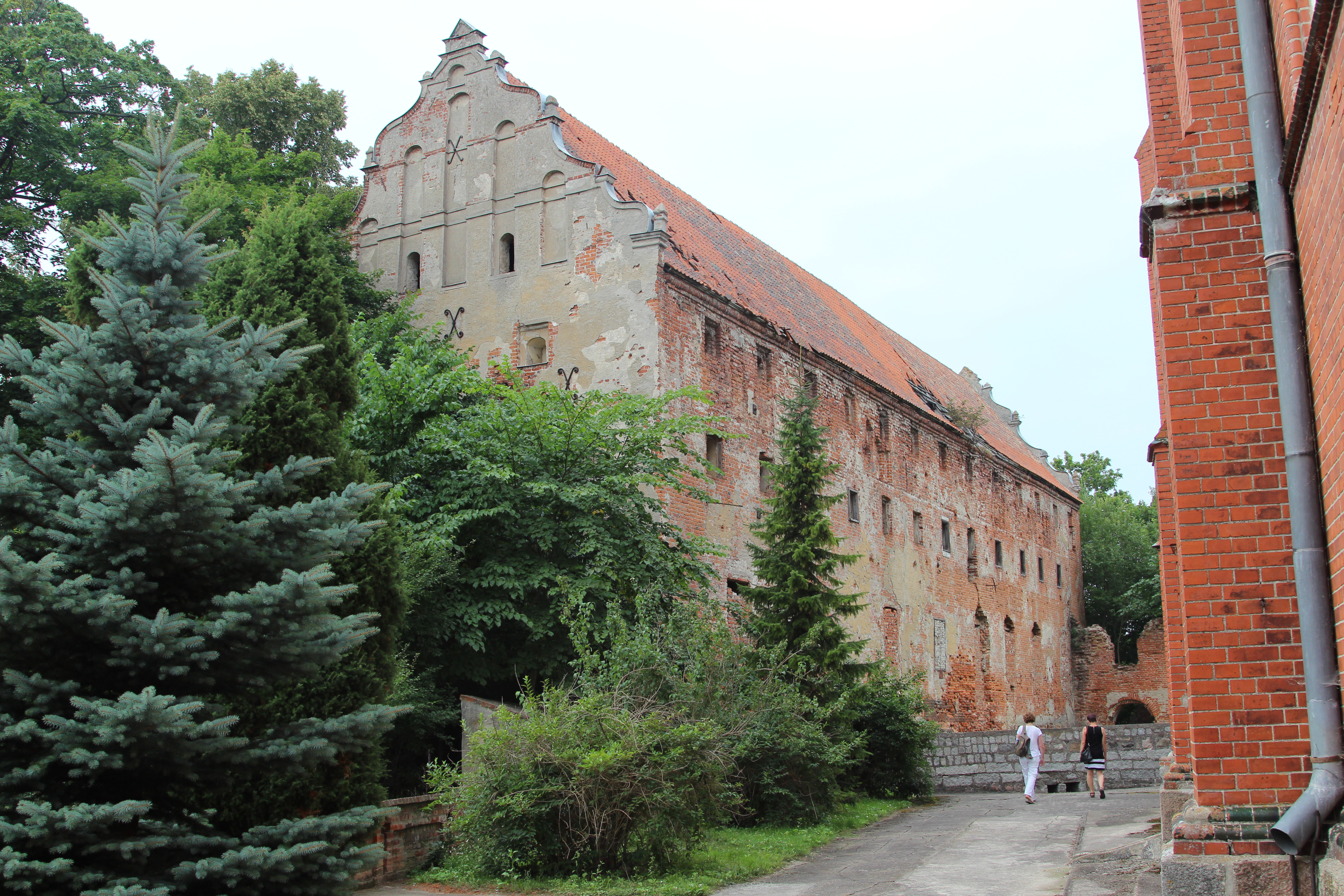
Pieniężno Castle
Brick Gothic churches of Warmia (examples)

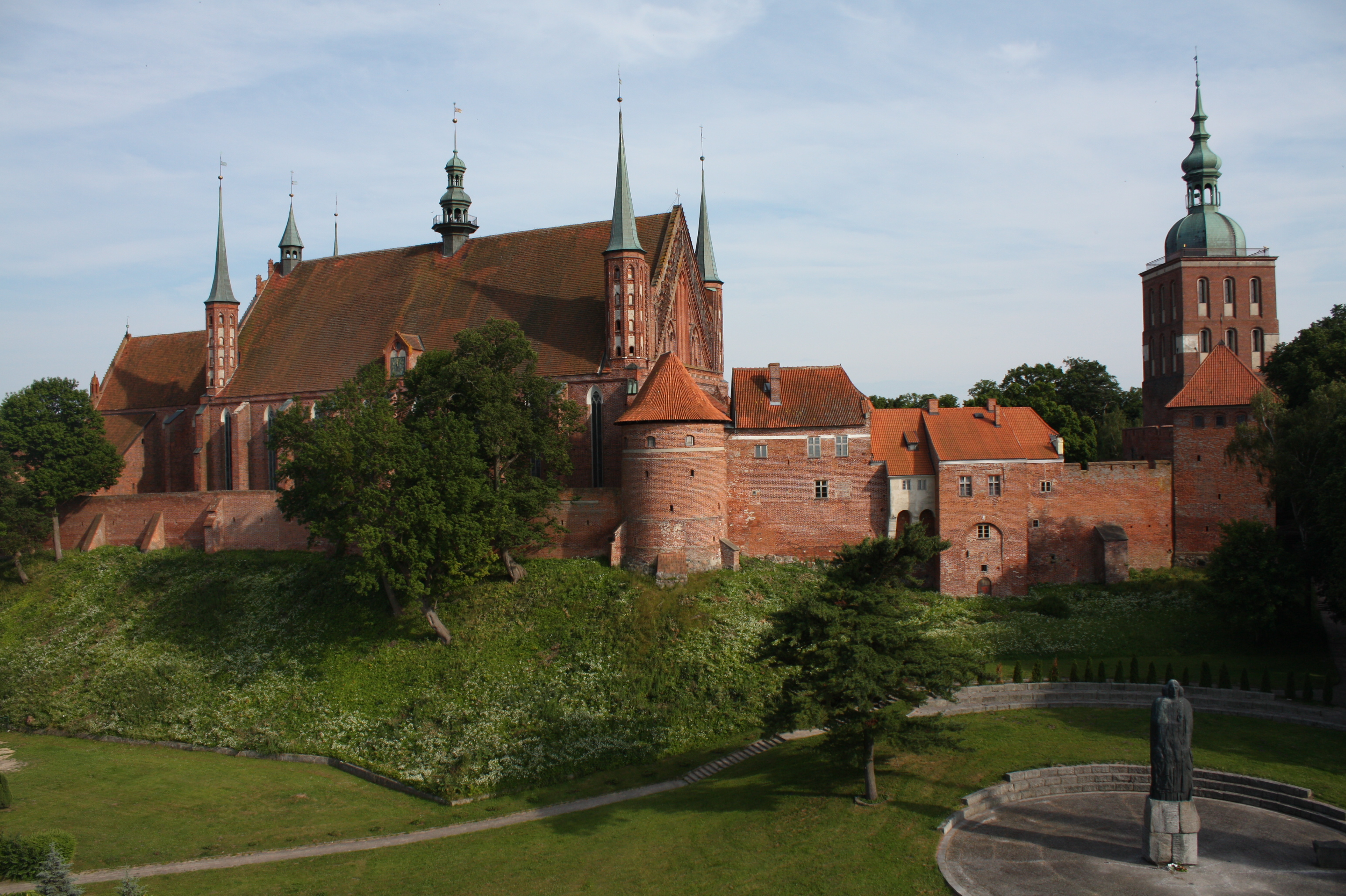
Frombork Cathedral

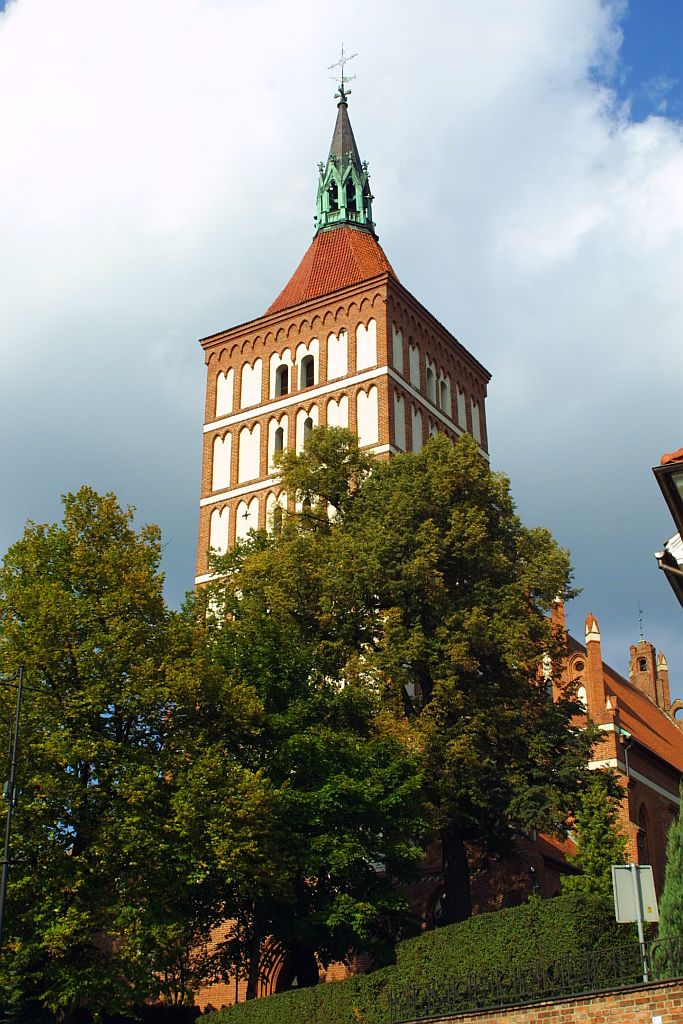
Saint James Pro-cathedral in Olsztyn

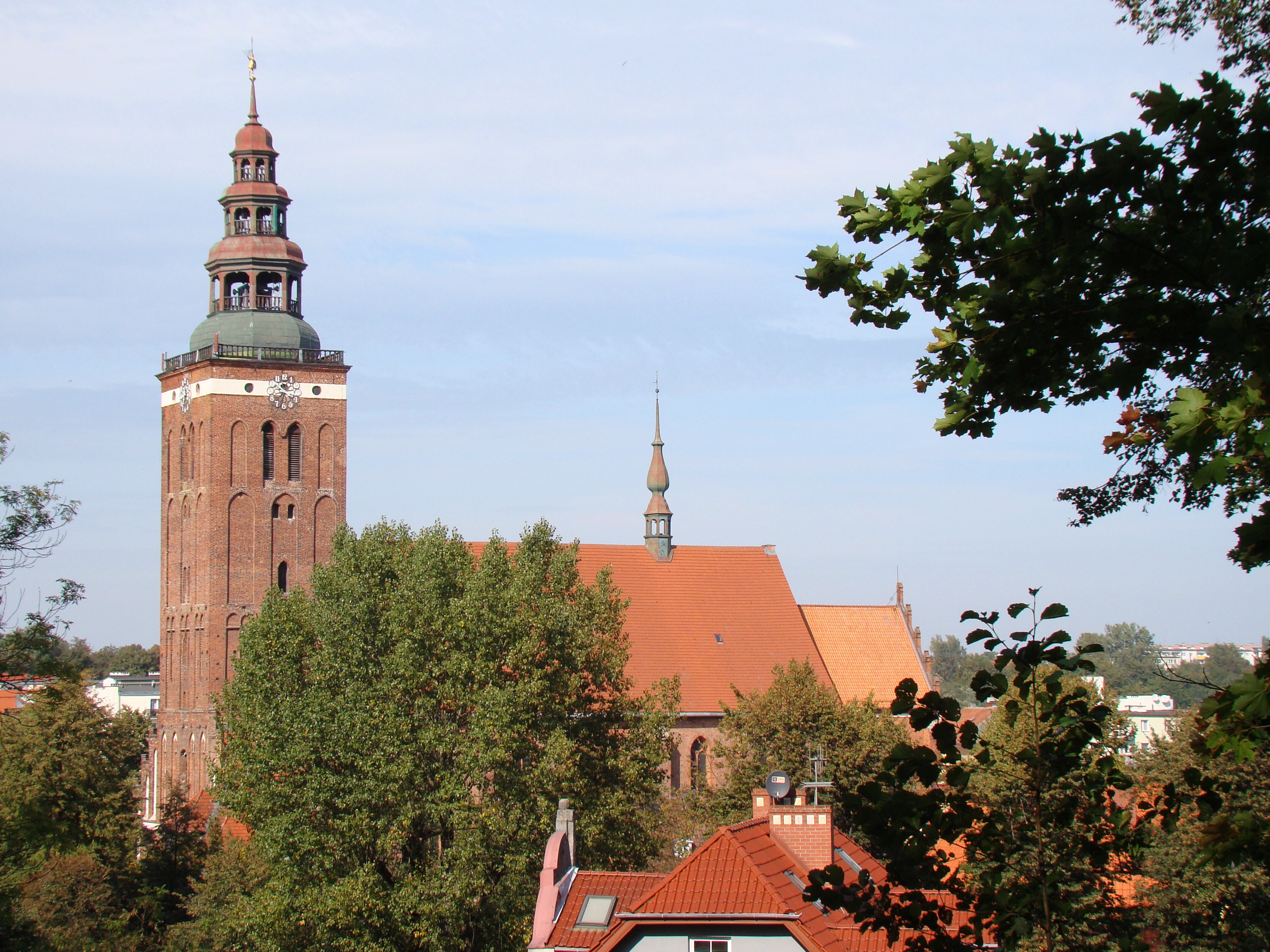
Collegiate church in Lidzbark Warmiński

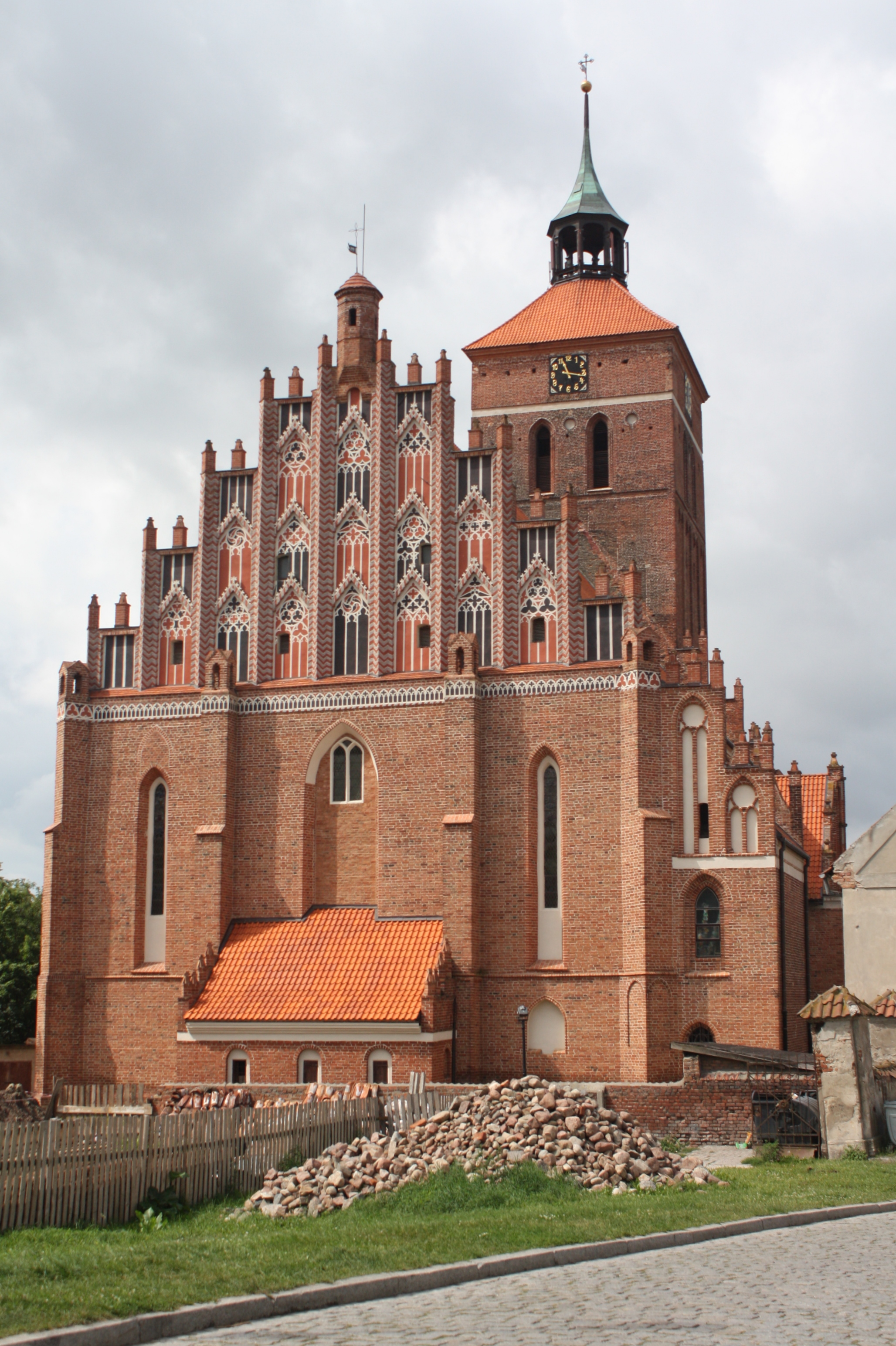
Saints Peter and Paul church in Reszel

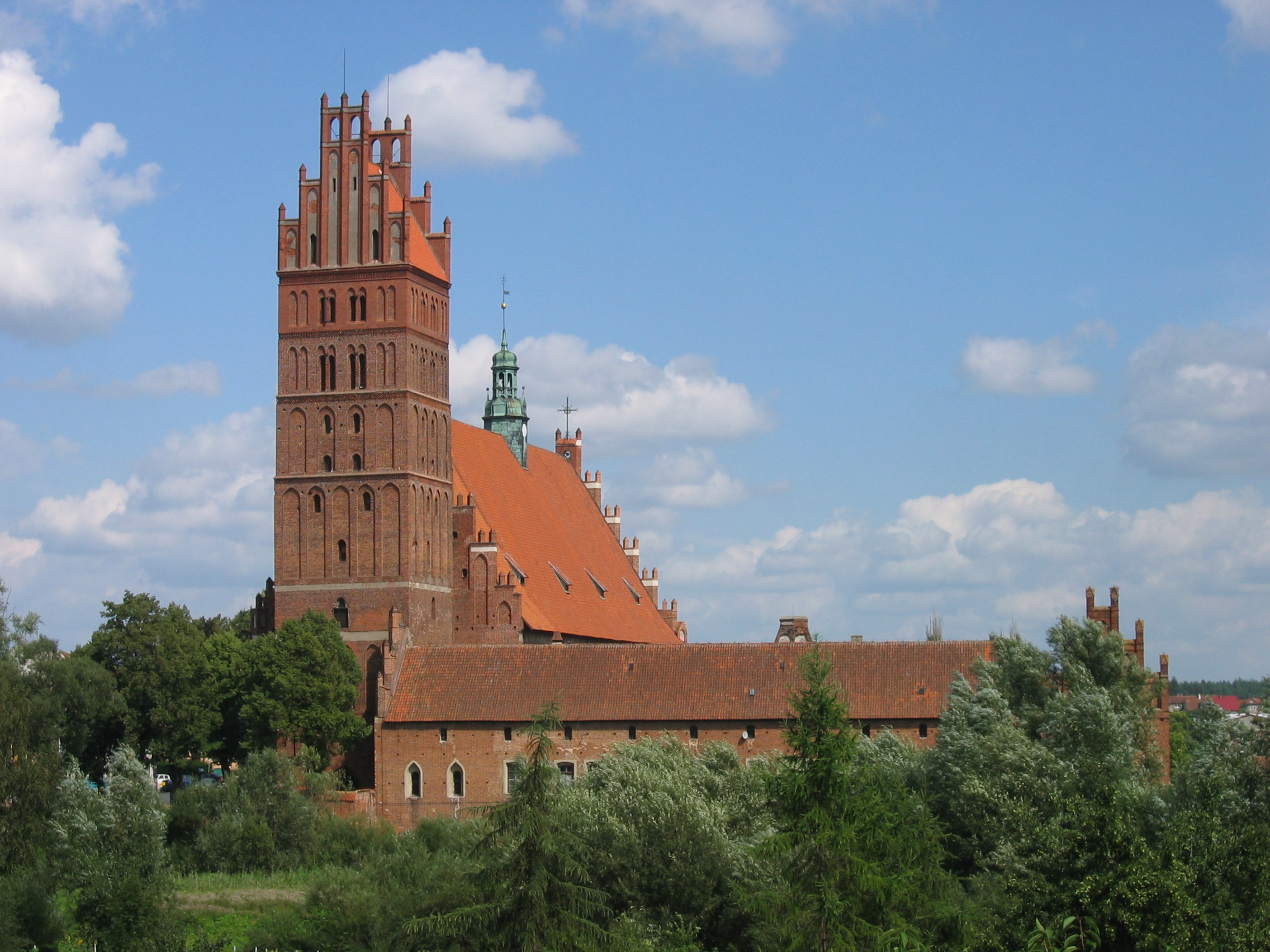
Collegiate church in Dobre Miasto

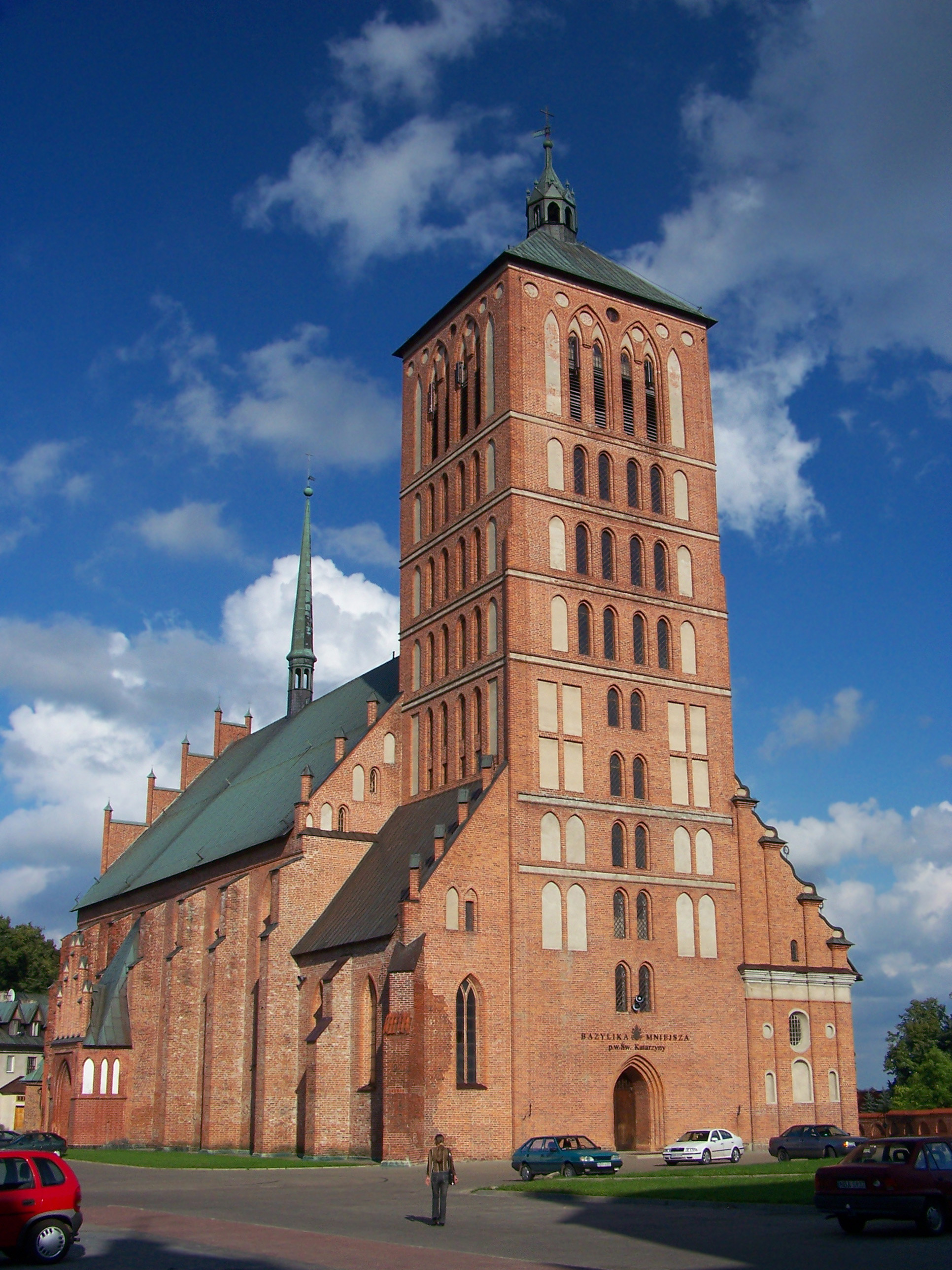
Saint Catherine of Alexandria Basilica in Braniewo

== People ==
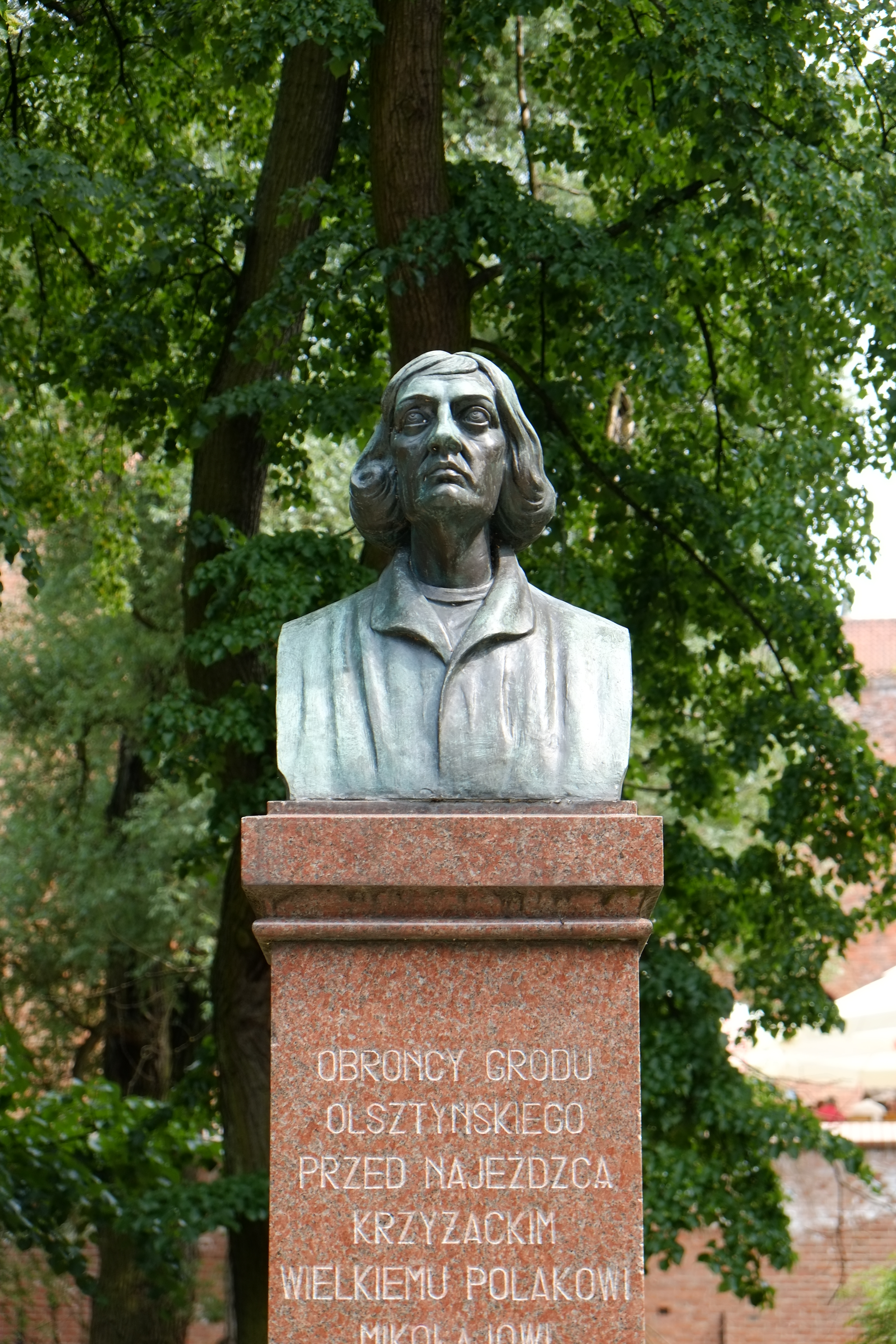
Bust of Nicolaus Copernicus in Olsztyn

- Nicolaus Copernicus (1473 in Toruń – 1543 in Frombork), mathematician and astronomer
- Stanislaus Hosius (1504 in Kraków – 1579 in Capranica), Polish writer and diplomat, Bishop of Warmia
- Marcin Kromer (1512 in Biecz – 1589 in Lidzbark Warmiński), Polish cartographer, diplomat and historian, personal secretary of the Kings of Poland, Bishop of Warmia
- Regina Protmann (1552 in Braunsberg – 1613 in Braunsberg), Polish Roman Catholic, founder of the Sisters of Saint Catherine
- Andrzej Chryzostom Załuski (1650 – 1711 in Dobre Miasto), Polish translator, prolific writer, Bishop of Warmia
- Ignacy Krasicki (1735 in Dubiecko – 1801 in Berlin), leading Polish Enlightenment poet
- Antoni Blank (1785 in Olsztyn – 1844 in Warsaw), Polish painter
- Hugo Haase (1863 in Allenstein – 1919 in Berlin), German socialist politician, jurist and pacifist
- Feliks Nowowiejski (1877 in Wartenburg – 1946 in Poznań), Polish composer, conductor, concert organist and music teacher
- Maximilian Kaller (1880 in Bytom – 1947 in Frankfurt on Main), Roman Catholic Bishop of Warmia
- Erich Mendelsohn (1887 in Allenstein – 1953 in San Francisco), Jewish German architect, known for expressionist architecture
- Hans-Jürgen Wischnewski (1922 in Allenstein – 2005 in Cologne), German SPD politician
- Rainer Barzel (1924 in Braunsberg – 2006 in Munich), German CDU politician
- Georg Sterzinsky (1936 in Warlack – 2011 in Berlin), German cardinal of the Roman Catholic Church and the Archbishop of Berlin

== See also ==
- Prince-Bishopric of Warmia
- Archbishopric of Warmia
- Bishops of Warmia
