= Cathedral Hill, Frombork =

Middle Ages historical monument site in Poland

Coordinates: 54°21′26″N 19°40′52″E

The Cathedral Hill (Wzgórze Katedralne) in Frombork, Poland is a Middle Ages historical monument site.

Its major monuments include:

- Archcathedral Basilica of the Assumption of the Blessed Virgin Mary and Saint Andrew (built in 1329-1388). Among other historical objects, it includes Nicolaus Copernicus epitaph and grave (reburied)
- Bishop's palace
- Radziejowski Tower (Wieża Radziejowskiego)
- Copernicus Tower
- Southern Gate
- Canonries
