= Archcathedral Basilica of the Assumption of the Blessed Virgin Mary and St. Andrew, Frombork =

Cathedral in Frombork, Poland

Archcathedral Basilica of the Assumption of the Blessed Virgin Mary and Saint Andrew in Frombork
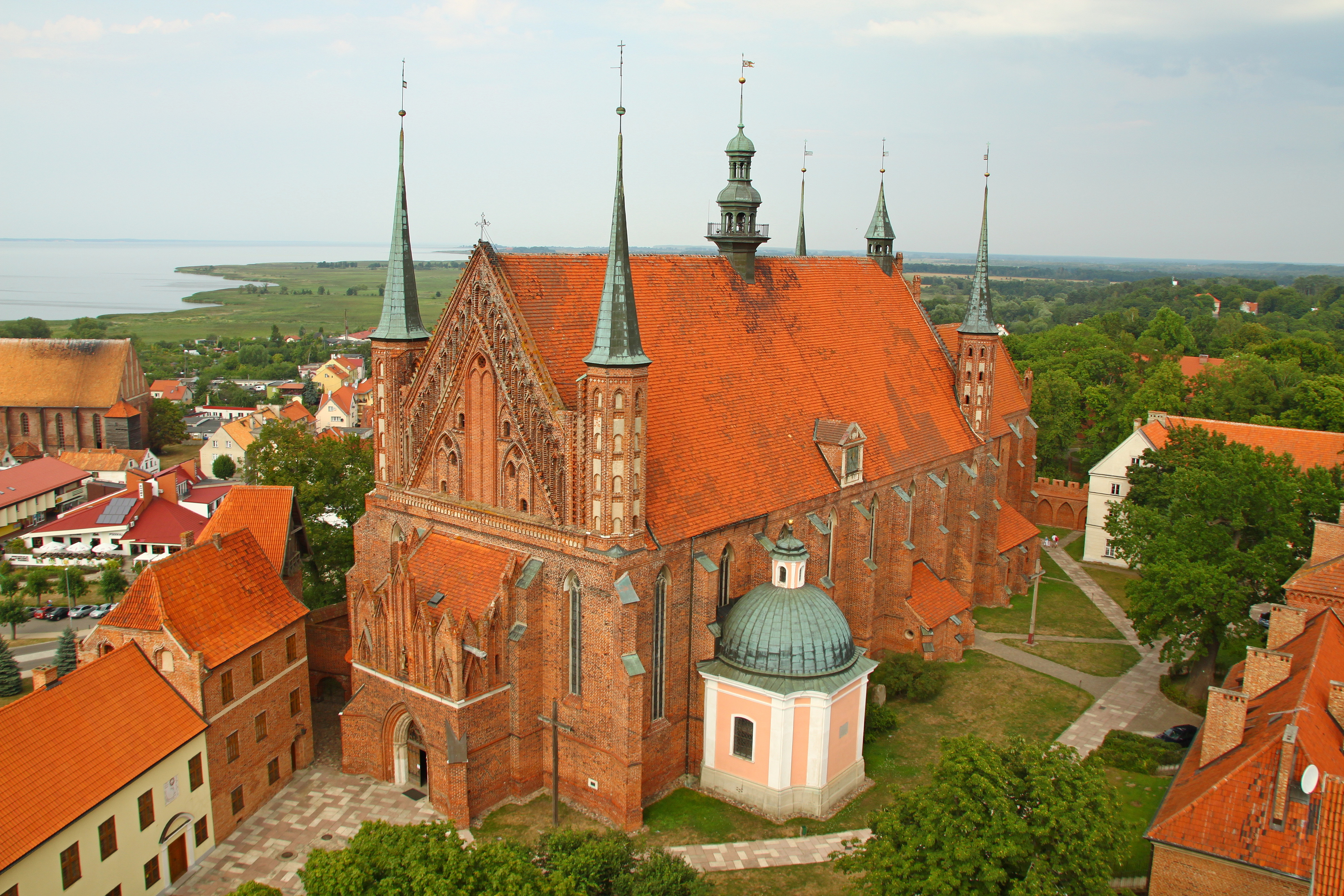
- Frombork Archcathedral; Bazylika archikatedralna Wniebowzięcia Najświętszej Maryi Panny i św. Andrzeja we Fromborku (in Polish)

Religion
- Affiliation: Roman Catholic
- Diocese: Cathedral Hill
- Province: Warmia
- Rite: Latin
- Ecclesiastical or organizational status: Archcathedral Basilica
- Year consecrated: 1288, 1388

Location
- Location: Frombork, Poland
- Interactive map of Archcathedral Basilica of the Assumption of the Blessed Virgin Mary and Saint Andrew in Frombork
- Coordinates: 54.357083°N 19.681667°E

Architecture
- Style: Brick Gothic
- Completed: 1388

Specifications
- Length: 90m
- Height (max): 16m
- Materials: Brick
- Historic Monument of Poland
- Designated: 1994-09-08
- Reference no.: M.P. z 1994 r. Nr 50, poz. 414

Frombork Cathedral or the Archcathedral Basilica of the Assumption of the Blessed Virgin Mary and Saint Andrew (Polish: Bazylika archikatedralna Wniebowzięcia Najświętszej Maryi Panny i św. Andrzeja we Fromborku) in Frombork, Poland, is a Roman Catholic church located in the small town of Frombork in northern Poland. Constructed between 1329 and 1388, it replaced an earlier building dating from 1288. It stands on Cathedral Hill on Cathedral Street (ul. Katedralna 8).

The basilica is on Poland's official national Historic Monuments List (Pomnik historii), designated on 16 September 1994. It comes under the National Heritage Board of Poland.

== History ==
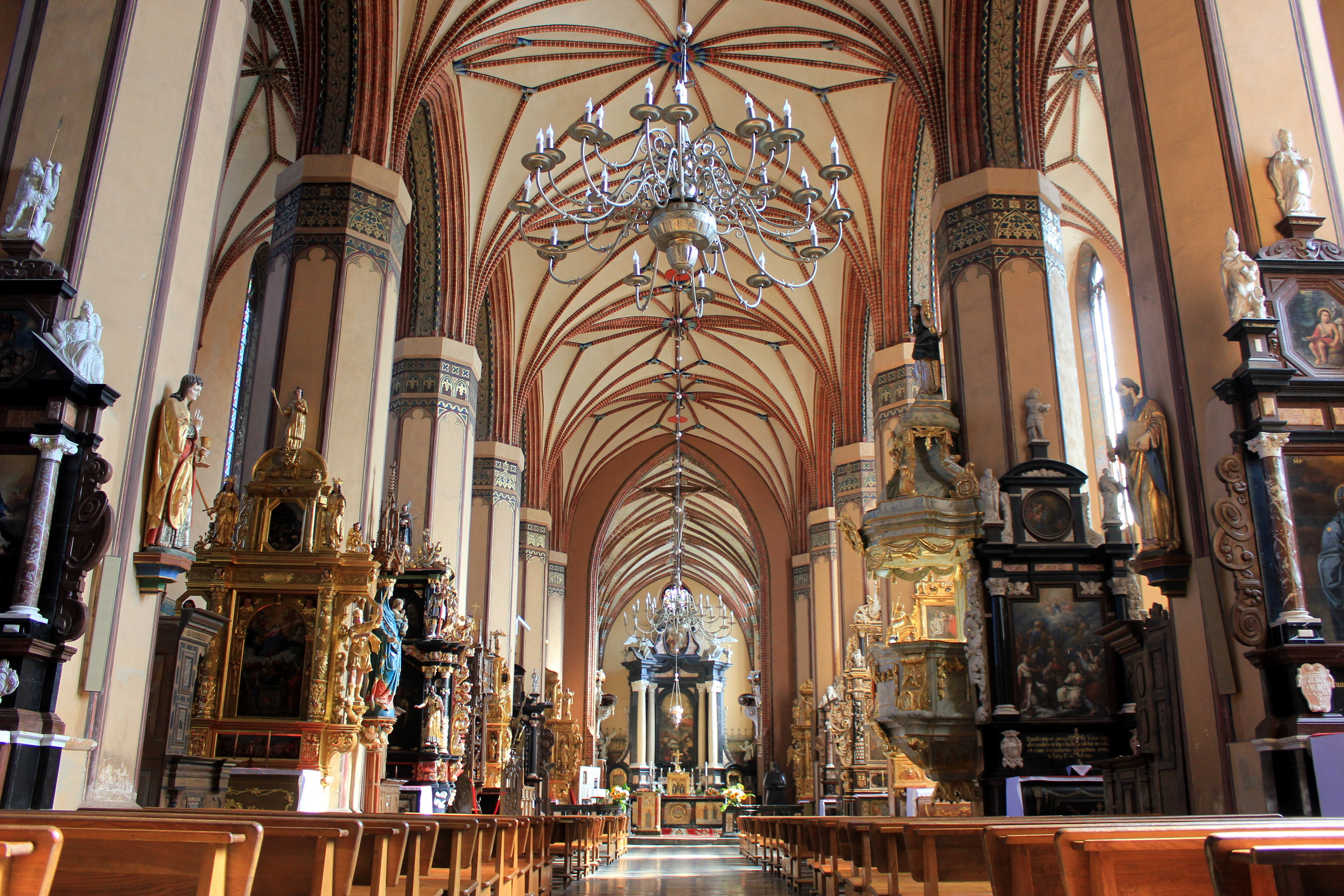
Cathedral Interior

The original cathedral, completed in 1288, was a timber structure. It was called Ecclesia Warmiensis, indicating that it was the main diocesan building. In 1329, erection began of a brick and stone church and lasted until 1388, giving rise to the present cathedral. It comprises three naves 90 meters long and 16.5 meters tall, ending in a single chancel.

The building had no tower until the end of the 16th century, when a series of renaissance spires was added at the corners. In 1638, a clock was inserted in the central spire.

At the beginning of the 18th century, the church was enlarged on the northern aspect and a highly ornate portal was added to the entrance.

Between 1887 and 1891 the interior was radically refurbished, to achieve the extant decorative order. The artist Justus Bornowski of Elbląg designed the murals. There are fragments of a Late Gothic painting, showing early Church Fathers and the crest of Bishop Nicholas Tungen in the chancel.

In 1966, a copy of the Black Madonna of Częstochowa was meant to visit Frombork to celebrate the 1000th anniversary of Christianity in Poland, but communist authorities confiscated it. At the cathedral in Frombork, Cardinal Stefan Wyszyński instead addressed a crowd of 10,000 people where he lamented the seizure and declared the work to have been blasphemed.

=== Link to Copernicus ===
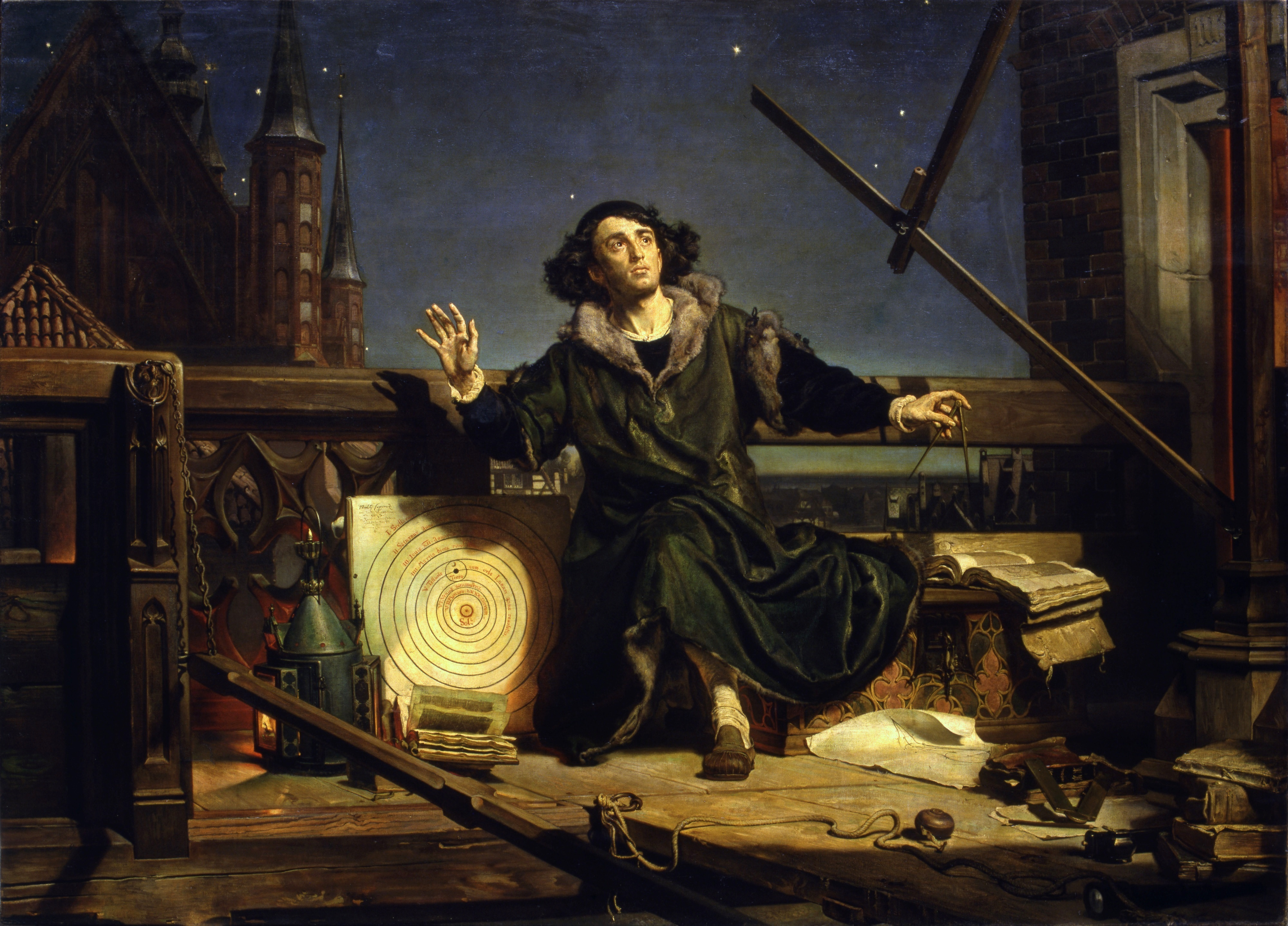
Frombork Cathedral in background of Jan Matejko's 1873 painting, Astronomer Copernicus, or Conversations with God.

The astronomer and mathematician Nicolaus Copernicus worked here as a canon (1512–1516 and 1522–1543). He wrote his epochal work, De revolutionibus orbium cœlestium in Frombork. Shortly after its 1543 publication, Copernicus died there and was buried in the cathedral where his grave was thought to have been found by archaeologists in 2005. This was subsequently confirmed in November 2008 by the publication of the results of DNA tests on fragments of bone and hair found on the skeleton; hair that matched two strands of hair which belonged to Copernicus and are currently located in Uppsala University.

In the northwest corner of the cathedral grounds is Copernicus' tower, and in the southwest corner an octagonal building with a square bell tower and a small planetarium and a Foucault's pendulum.

The city suffered destruction during the Polish–Swedish wars. Between 1626 and 1635 it was occupied by Gustavus Adolphus of Sweden who looted the cathedral and removed many cultural artefacts, including Copernicus' manuscripts to Sweden.

The town and cathedral were badly damaged in World War II. After the war the cathedral was meticulously reconstructed.

== See also ==
- Castles in Poland
