= Karol Ferdynand Vasa =

- Bishop of Wrocław; Bishop of Płock; Duke of Opole
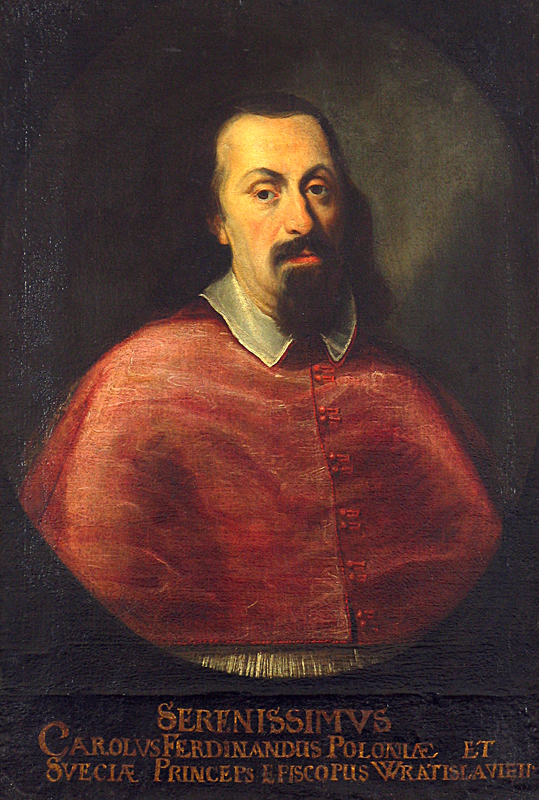
- Portrait by Daniel Schultz
- Born: 13 October 1613; Warsaw, Poland
- Died: 9 May 1655 (aged 41); Wyszków, Poland
- Burial: Jesuits' Church, Warsaw
- House: Vasa
- Father: Sigismund III Vasa
- Mother: Constance of Austria
- Religion: Roman Catholic

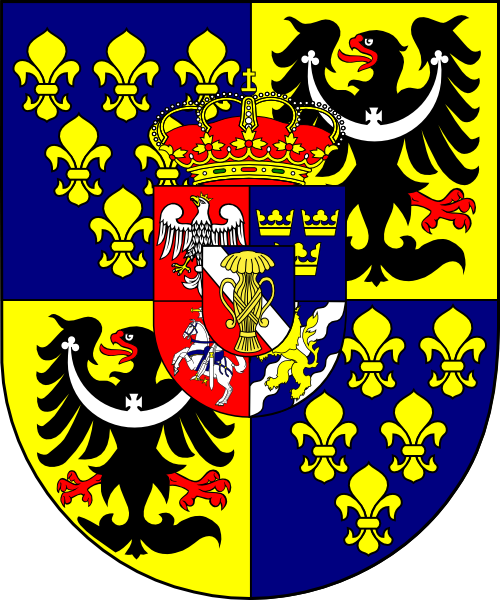
Coat of arms

Prince Charles Ferdinand Vasa (Polish: Karol Ferdynand Waza; 13 October 1613 in Warsaw – 9 May 1655 in Wyszków), was a Polish prince, priest, Bishop of Wrocław from 1625, bishop of Płock from 1640 and Duke of Opole from 1648 to 1655.

== Biography ==
Charles Ferdinand was the fourth son of King Sigismund III Vasa and his wife Constance of Austria and the brother of John Casimir, John Albert, Alexander Charles and Anna Catherine Constance. Charles Ferdinand spent his childhood and youth in the care of his mother at the royal court in Warsaw. On 23 March 1624 he received dispensation from Pope Urban VIII, allowing him to take the dignity of being a canon in Wrocław. In this case, cardinal-protector Cosmo de Torres intervened with the pope.

On 3 May 1625, through the political efforts of Ferdinand II, Holy Roman Emperor, he was appointed the Bishop of Wrocław. On 22 October 1625 he received papal approval for the post. On 18 January 1626, despite being a minor (12 years old) and not having a proper ordination ceremony he was officially installed as bishop.

In 1629, he added the Prudnik district to the Diocese of Wrocław (before that, Prudnik was a part of the Olomouc Diocese). After the death of his mother in 1631, together with his brother John Casimir he inherited the wealthy city of Żywiec in Lesser Poland. During the reign of Władysław IV, Charles Ferdinand resided mainly in Warsaw. Being a close relative of the royal court, however, he was not interested in politics and had no ambition to acquire the secular authorities. Between 1632 and 1648 he devoted his time mostly to administrative work, financial affairs and accumulation of ecclesiastical benefice. In 1640 he was appointed the Bishop of Płock. After his coming of age, Charles Ferdinand decided never to accept the ordination of priesthood and gave the control of the Archdiocese of Wrocław to other influential bishops and priests that would be in charge like Bishop John von Balthasar Liesch Hornau and Archdeacon Peter Gebauer. Similarly, with the Archdiocese of Płock, he gave control over the sect to Stanisław Starczewski and Wojciech Tolibowski

After the death of King Władysław IV Vasa in 1648, he was a candidate to the Polish throne, together with his brother John Casimir whom he supported. Later he has launched a tough policy and decisive steps to quell the civil war in Polish occupied Ruthenia and Ukraine. He received the support of two-thirds majority of senators and bishops in the Polish Sejm (Parliament). Most notably he was supported by the Ruthenian nobles led by Jeremi Wiśniowiecki, however, his policies were opposed by the Protestants, Lutherans and by the nobility of the Grand Duchy of Lithuania, which feared the tightening of the Counter-Reformation. At the forefront of opposition to Charles Ferdinand Vasa stood Janusz Radziwiłł and his brother Bogusław Radziwiłł, who even threatened to break the Polish-Lithuanian union.

After losing the election, Charles Ferdinand received, from his brother and newly elected king, the Duchy of Opole and Racibórz. He then retired from public life. He settled on the estates of the bishops in Płock, in Mazovia. His main residence was a large renaissance castle in Brok. In 1651, he took care of the orphaned and deprived of estates in Ruthenia, Michael Korybut Wiśniowiecki (later King Michael I). Vasa financed his travels abroad and provided thorough education and studies in the best schools of Europe.

Charles Ferdinand Vasa died on 9 May 1655 in Wyszków. He was buried in the Jesuit Church in Warsaw.

Charles Ferdinand Vasa left a huge fortune and the majority of it was spent on various foundations of churches in the country. The rest was inherited by his brother John II Casimir. Money and estates inherited from the king's brother helped to finance the troops and the military during the Polish-Swedish War (known as the "Deluge"), and the Duchy of Silesia provided the king with shelter when he had to flee Poland in 1655.

Charles Ferdinand was a great patron of art and supporter of the Society of Jesus (he had an enormous silver altar built for the Jesuit Church in Warsaw). In the 1640s, royal architect, Giovanni Battista Gisleni built for him a palace situated on the northern bastion of the Warsaw Royal Castle fortifications. It was later ransacked and destroyed by Swedes and Germans of Brandenburg in 1650s, during the Deluge. He also had a large wooden palace in Wyszków.

== Gallery ==
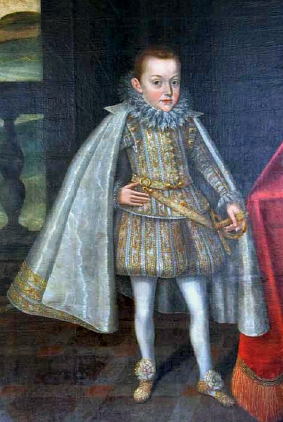
Vasa in his youth

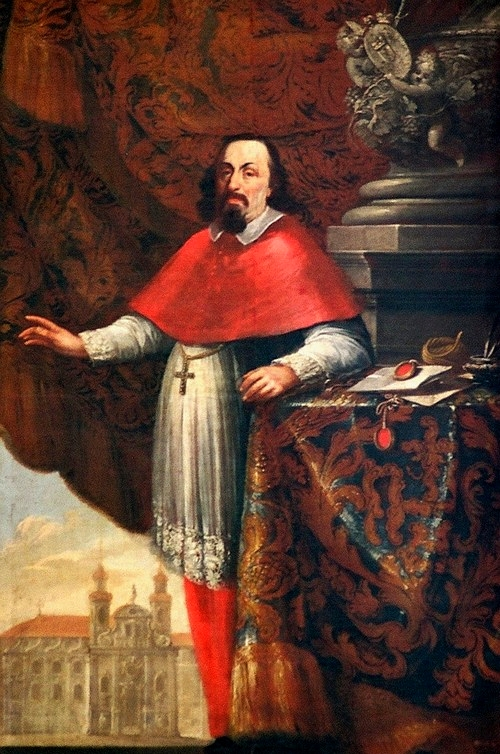
Portrait of Bishop Charles Ferdinand Vasa, painter unknown

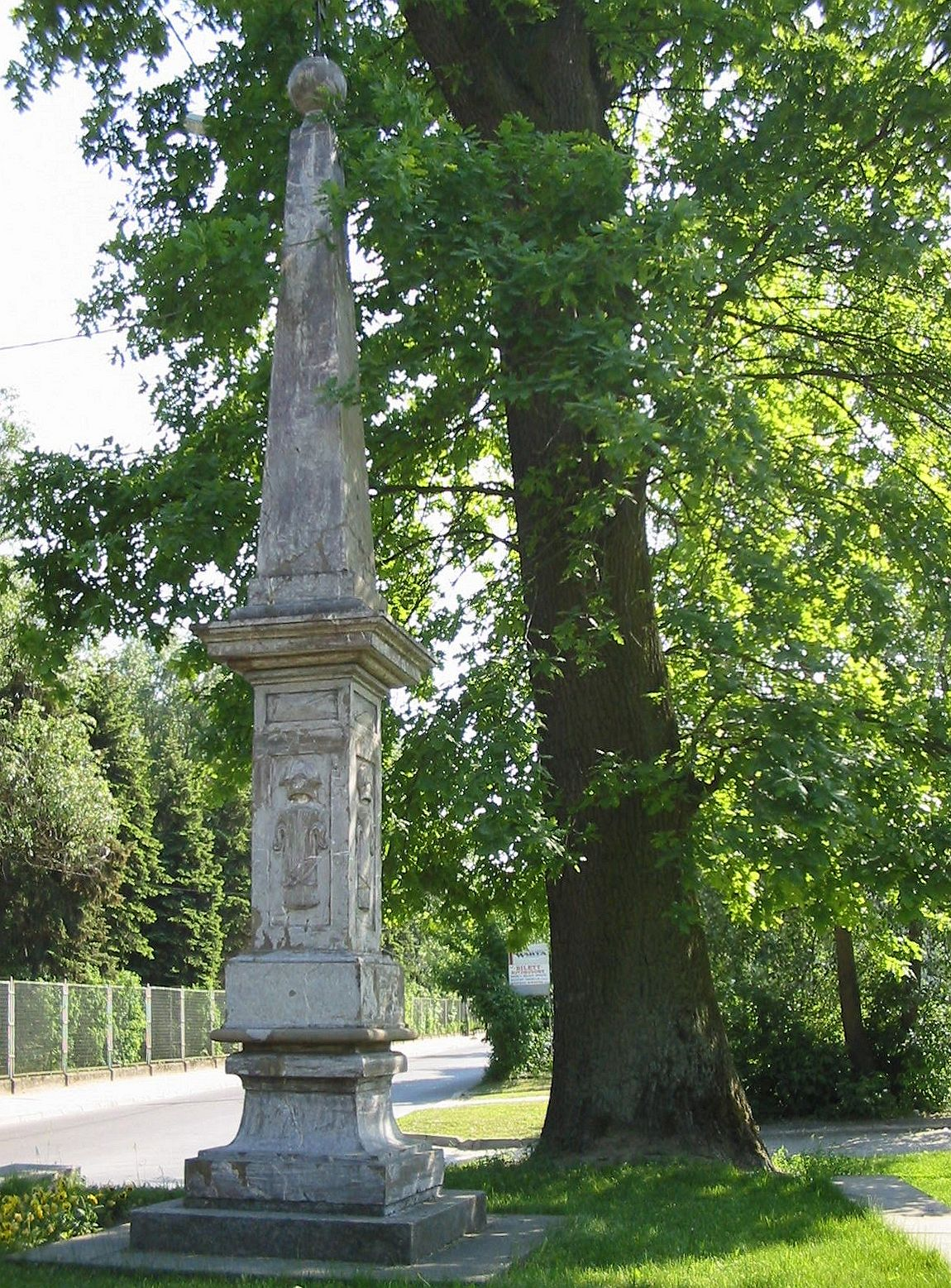
Monument dedicated to memory of Karol Ferdynand Waza in Wyszków, erected after his death in 1655.

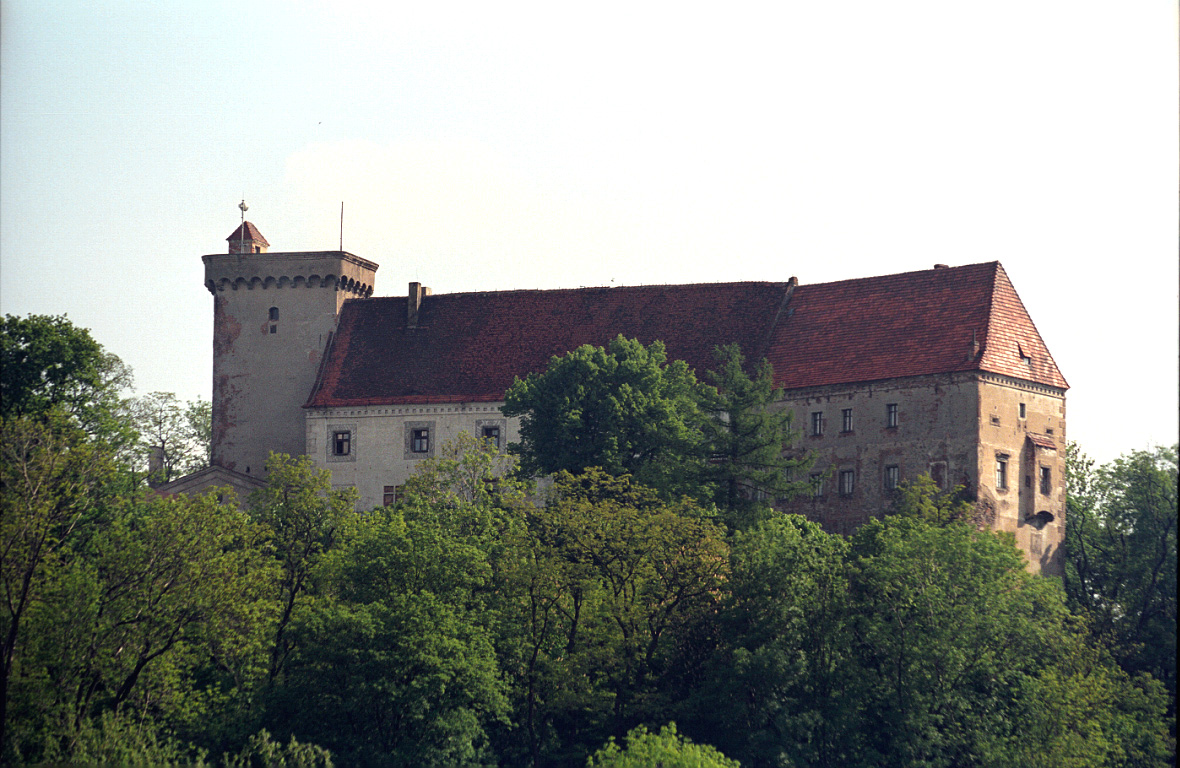
He rebuilt the Castle in Otmuchów, after devastation during the Thirty Years' War.

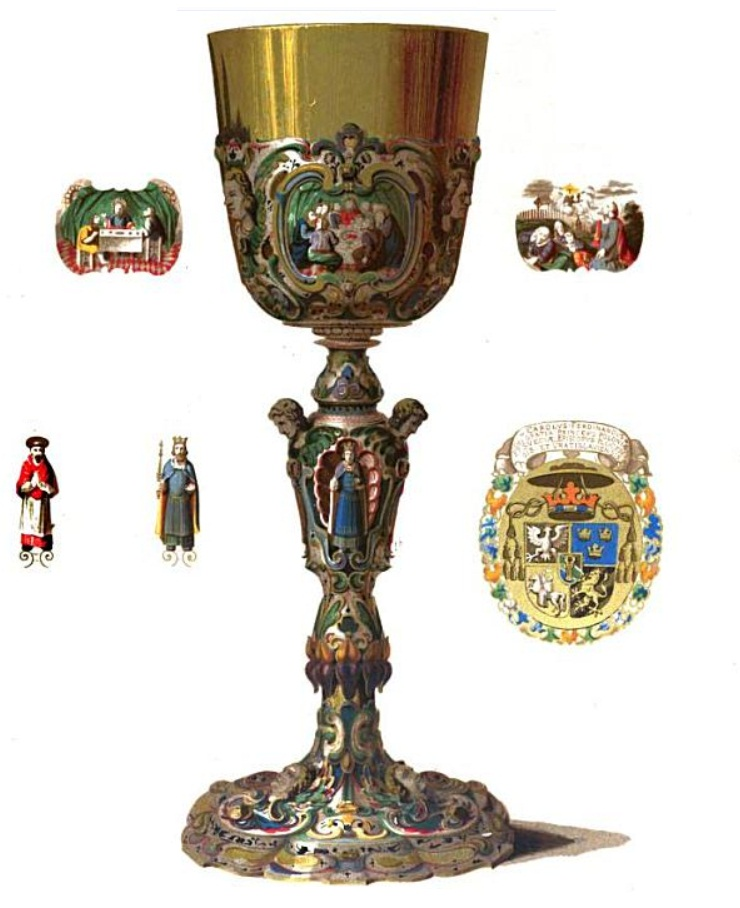
Golden chalice commissioned by Charles Ferdinand

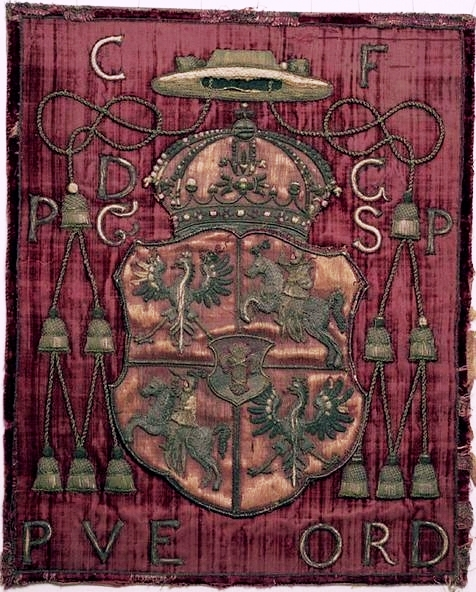
Bishop's banner

== Ancestors ==
Ancestors of Karol Ferdynand Vasa

8. Gustav I of Sweden
4. John III of Sweden
9. Margaret Leijonhufvud
2. Sigismund III Vasa
10. Sigismund I the Old
5. Catherine Jagiellon
11. Bona Sforza
1. Karol Ferdynand Vasa
12. Ferdinand I, Holy Roman Emperor
6. Charles II, Archduke of Austria
13. Anna of Bohemia and Hungary
3. Constance of Austria
14. Albert V, Duke of Bavaria
7. Duchess Maria Anna of Bavaria
15. Archduchess Anna of Austria

== See also ==
- Płock Cathedral
- Nysa

Karol Ferdynand Vasa House of Vasa Born: 13 October 1613 in Warsaw Died: 9 May 1655 in Wyszków
Religious titles
Regnal titles
| Preceded by Karl von Innerösterreich | Prince-Bishop of Wrocław; 1625–1655 (He was represented by Administrator Johann Balthasar Liesch von Hornau, because Vasa did not reside in Breslau) | Succeeded by Archduke Leopold Wilhelm of Austria |
Religious titles
| Preceded by Stanisław Łubieński | Bishop of Płock; 1640–1655 | Succeeded by Jan Gembicki |
