= Łyna =

Łyna may refer to:

- Łyna River (Russian: Лава Lava, German: Alle), a river in Poland and Russia
- Łyna, Warmian-Masurian Voivodeship (German: Lahne), a village in Poland near the source of the river
