= John Albert Vasa =

Polish Catholic cardinal

His Eminence John Albert Vasa
- Cardinal, Bishop of Kraków
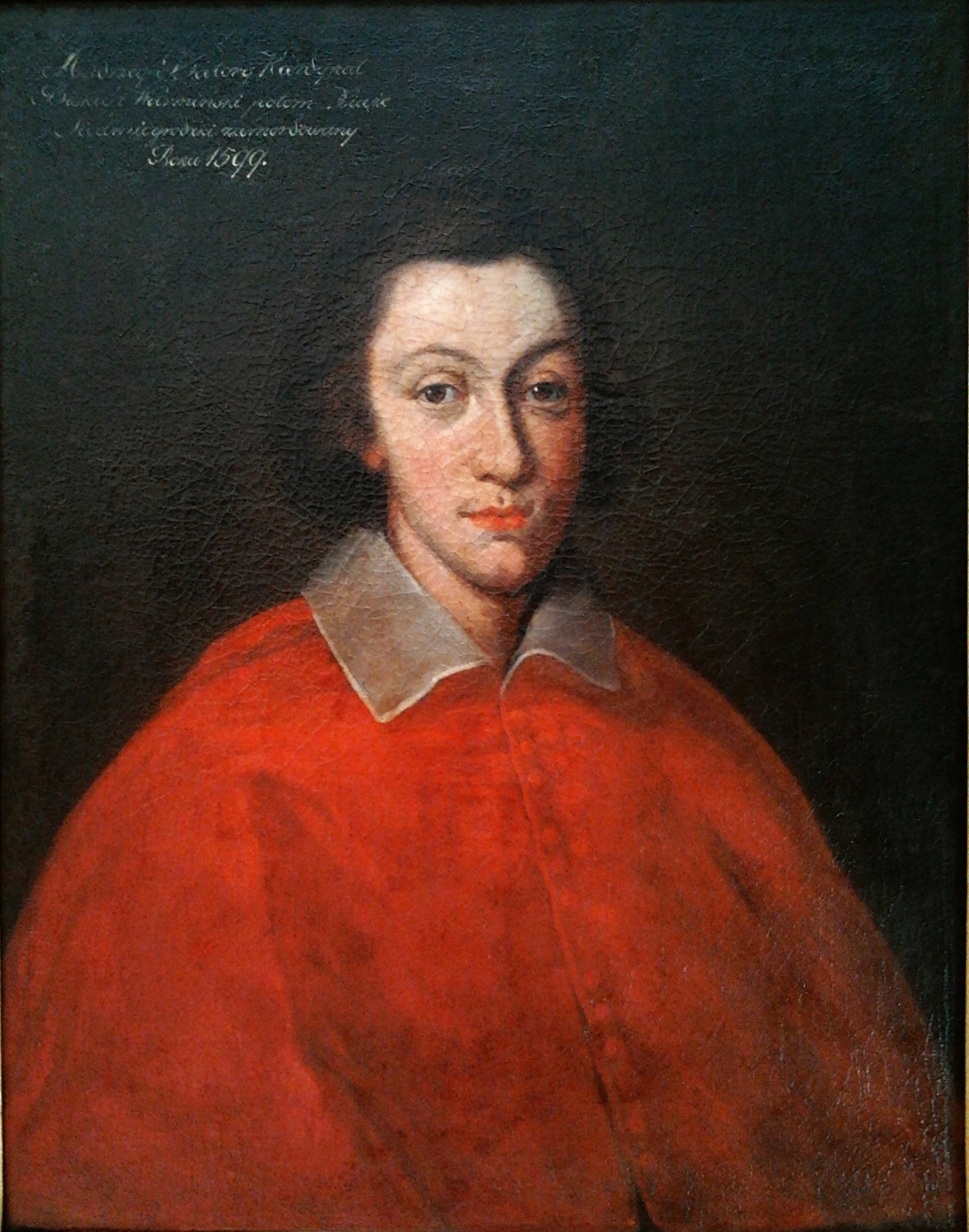
- Portrait of Cardinal John Albert Vasa by Tommaso Dolabella, ca. 1633, Museum of King John III's Palace at Wilanów
- Church: Roman Catholic Church
- Appointed: 20 November 1632
- Term ended: 29 December 1634
- Other post: Cardinal-Priest of Santa Maria in Aquiro (1632-1634)
- Previous post: Bishop of Warmia (1621-1632)

Orders
- Created cardinal: 19 November 1629 by Pope Urban VIII
- Rank: Cardinal-Priest

Personal details
- Born: 25 June 1612 Warsaw, Polish–Lithuanian Commonwealth
- Died: 29 December 1634 (aged 22) Padua, Republic of Venice

John Albert Vasa (Jan Albert Waza) (25 June 1612 – 29 December 1634) was a Polish cardinal, and a Prince-Bishop of Warmia and Kraków. He was the son of Sigismund III Vasa and Constance of Austria.

== Biography ==
John Albert Vasa was born in Warsaw in the Polish–Lithuanian Commonwealth. When he was 9 years old, after the death of Szymon Rudnicki his father chose him to be the next Prince-Bishop of Warmia. The pope agreed to that request on 21 October 1621. More difficult to reach was an agreement from the Warmian chapter, and the objections of szlachta delayed the final approval of this nomination in the Sejm until 1631. The prince never visited his diocese, it was governed in his name by the suffragan bishop Michał Działyński, archdeacon of Warsaw Jakub Wierzbipięta Borzuchowski and canon of Warmia, Paweł Piasecki. The cathedral at Frauenburg (Frombork) was enriched by the gifts from Jan Albert that included liturgical robes and a golden statue of Saint Andrew.

He was educated in the Society of Jesus.

On 20 November 1632 Vasa received the office of Prince Bishop of Cracow (after the death of Andrzej Lipski); he performed his duties in person from 27 February 1633.

On 20 December 1632 his cardinal nomination was declared in public; Pope Urban VIII signed the nomination on 19 October 1629 but in secret (in pectore tacite), and after revealing the information he granted Jan Albert the presbyterian title of Sanctae Marie in Aquiro.

Jan Albert died in Italy in 1634 at Padua, where he was likely sent by his brother, King Wladislaw IV Waza with a diplomatic mission. The cause of his death is uncertain - Albrycht S. Radziwill in his diary suggested that he was infected with smallpox when he met his brother, Aleksander Karol during their meeting before he left for Italy (Karol died this same year from smallpox). Paweł Piasecki suggests that the cause of his death could be some illness other than smallpox.

In the office of Bishop of Warmia he was succeeded by Mikolaj Szyszkowski in 1632. In the office of Bishop of Kraków he was succeeded by Jakub Zadzik.

== Gallery ==
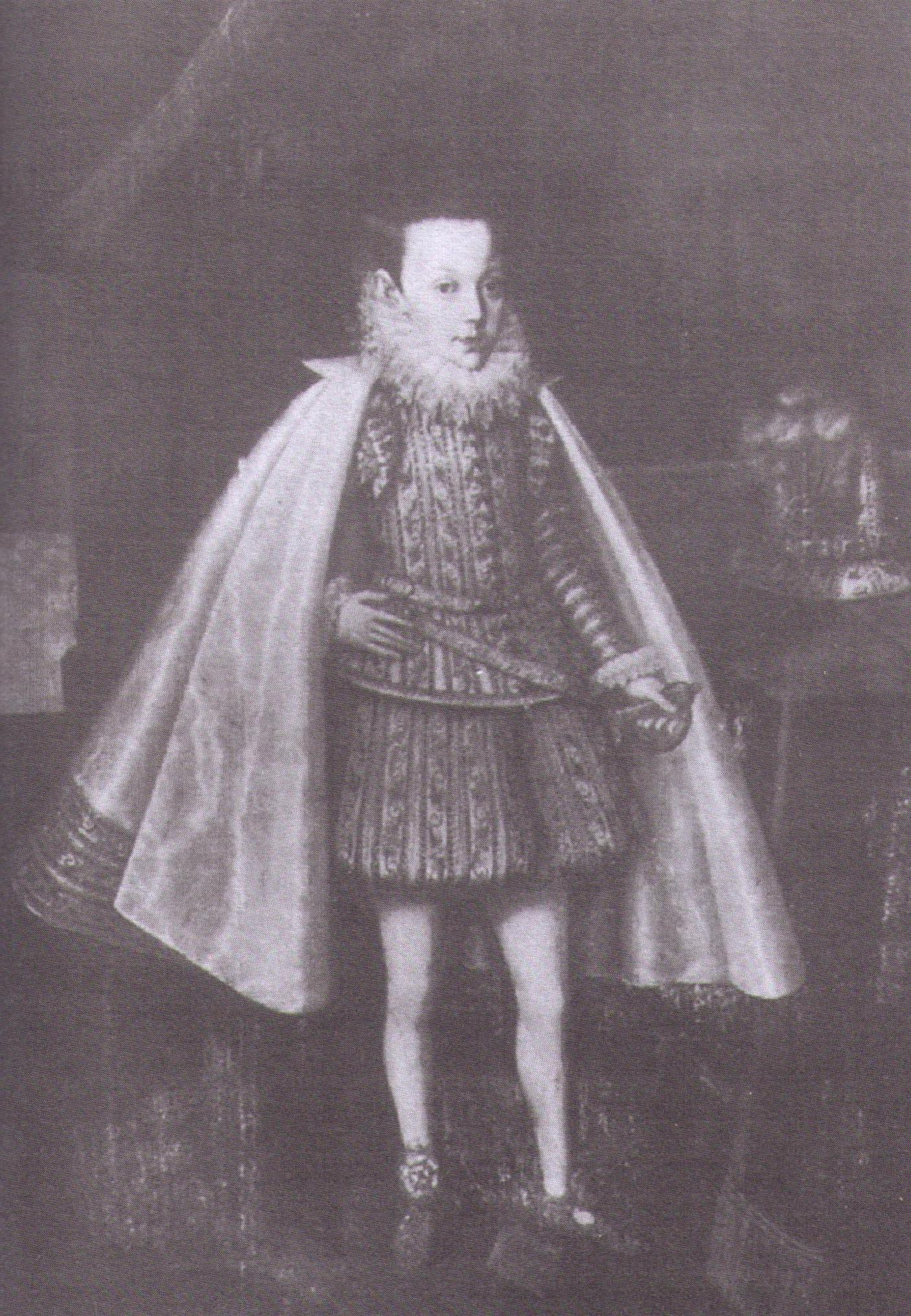
Prince royal John Albert Vasa, 1620s, Alte Pinakothek

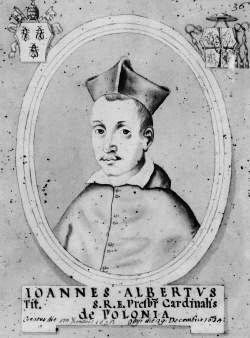
Cardinal John Albert Vasa, ca. 1632, Vatican Library

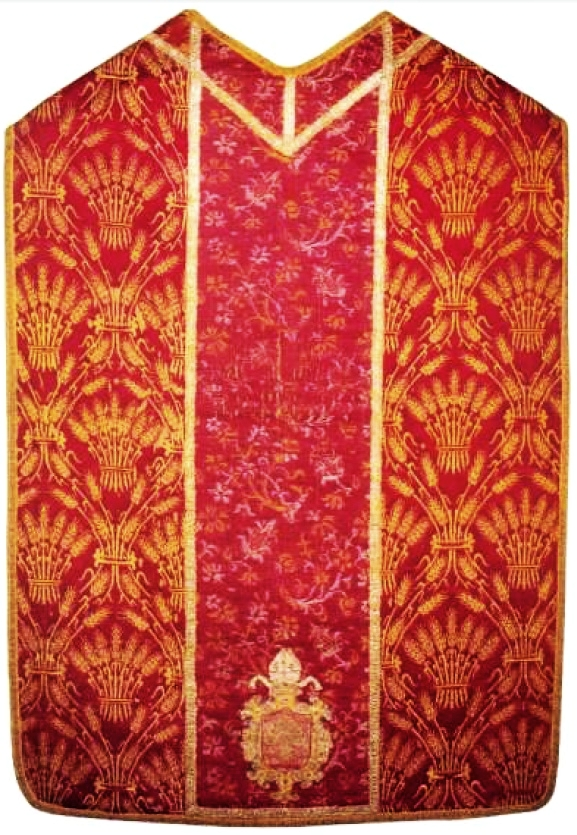
John Albert's ceremonial chasuble, adorned with a motif of golden sheaves of the House of Vasa

== See also ==
- Bishops of Warmia
- List of Roman Catholic bishops of Kraków

Catholic Church titles
Regnal titles
Preceded by Szymon Rudnicki	Prince-Bishop of Warmia (Ermland); 1621–1633	Succeeded by Mikołaj Szyszkowski
Catholic Church titles
Preceded by Andrzej Lipski	Bishop of Kraków; 1632–1633	Succeeded by Jakub Zadzik
