= Alexander Karl =

Alexander Karl may refer to:

- Alexander Charles Vasa (1614–1634), son of King Sigismund III of Poland
- Alexander Karl, Duke of Anhalt-Bernburg (1805–1863), German prince of the House of Ascania
