= Andrzej Lipski =

Bishop of Kraków

- Bishop of Kraków
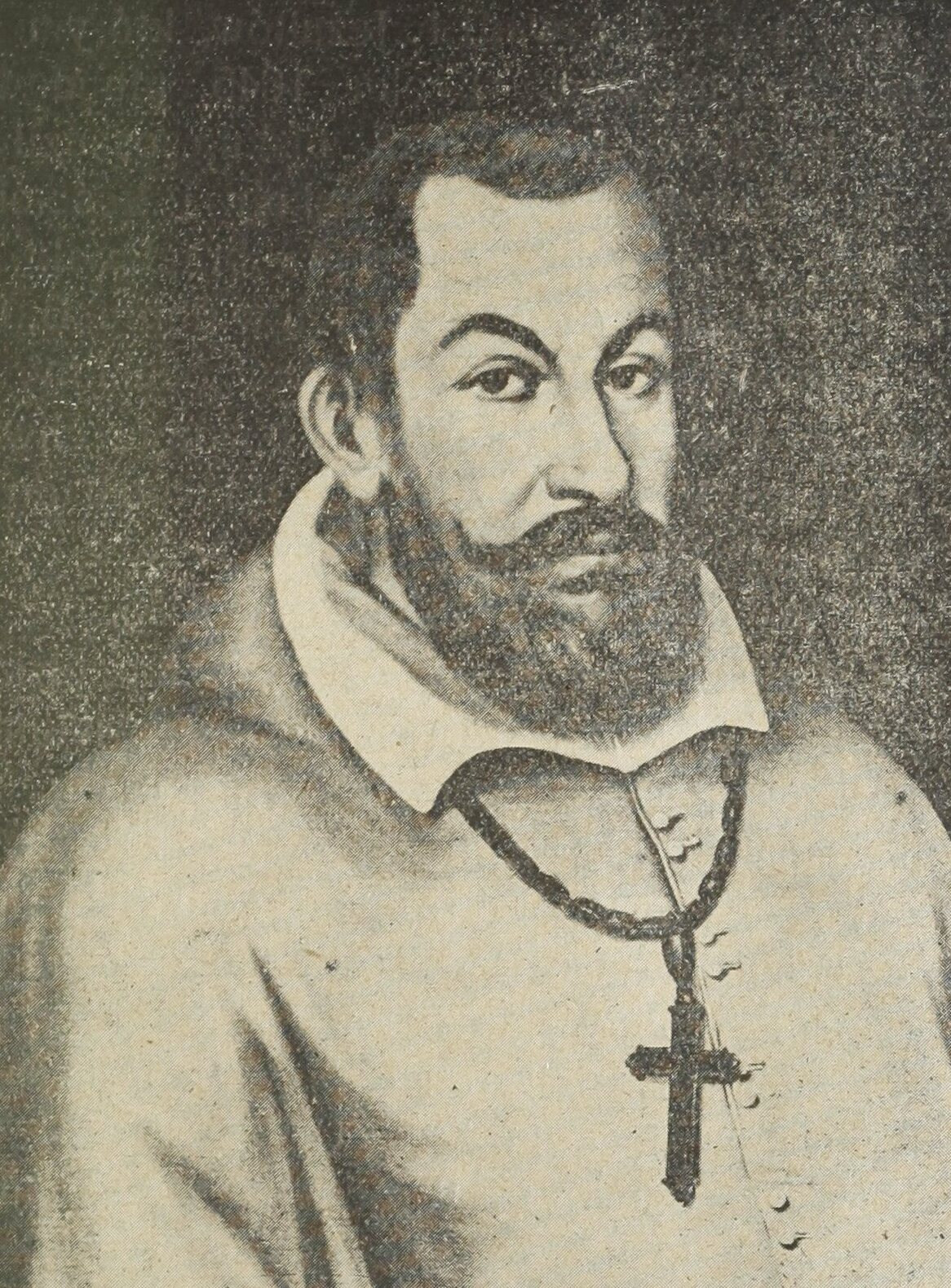
- Predecessor: Marcin Szyszkowski
- Successor: Jan Olbracht Waza

Personal details
- Born: 1572
- Died: 1631 (aged 58–59)

Andrzej Lipski (1572–1631) was a Polish nobleman, clergyman, and writer. He was the Bishop of Łuck, Włocławek, Kraków (1630-1631), and Grand Chancellor of the Crown. Lipski was born into a Lutheran Protestant family that claimed the Grabie coat of arms. He converted to Catholicism from Protestantism and received theological educations in Strasbourg and Rome. As Crown Chancellor, he advised the king on Roman law and played a role in military recruitment during the Khotyn War.

Lipski's tomb is located in the Lipski Chapel at the Wawel Cathedral. André-Jean Lebrun sculpted a bust of Lipski that exists at the National Museum in Warsaw.

== Works ==
- Historia de rebus gestis Sigismundi III Regis Poloniae
- Decas quaestionum publicarum Regni Poloniae
- Practicarum observationum de jure civili et saxonico collectarum Centuria 1
