= Łyna, Warmian-Masurian Voivodeship =

Łyna
- Village
- Location within Poland
- Coordinates: 53°26′N 20°25′E
- Country: Poland
- Voivodeship: Warmian-Masurian
- Powiat: Nidzica
- Gmina: Nidzica
- First mentioned: 1387
- Population: 440
- Time zone: UTC+1 (CET)
  - Summer (DST): UTC+2 (CEST)
- Postal code: 13-100
- Area code: +48 89
- ISO 3166 code: POL
- Car Plates: NNI
- Website: www.nidzica.pl

Łyna [ˈwɨna] is a village in Nidzica County, Warmian-Masurian Voivodeship, in northern Poland.

It is located in the historic region of Masuria.

The village is situated near the source of the Łyna River.

== History ==
It was first mentioned on 12 March 1387. At least since 1540 until 1945, Łyna was the seat of a church parish. In 1600, the population of the village was solely Polish. In 1620, Polish Royal secretary Stefan Sadorski obtained 19 włókas of land in Łyna. Various Polish noble families lived in the village throughout centuries, incl. the Chmielewski, Krasiński, Michałowski and Węgierski families. In 1857, it had a population of 239.

The Battle of Tannenberg took place nearby in August 1914 during World War I.

== Transport ==
The Polish S7 highway runs near Łyna, west of the village.
