= Constance of Austria =

Queen of Poland from 1605 to 1631

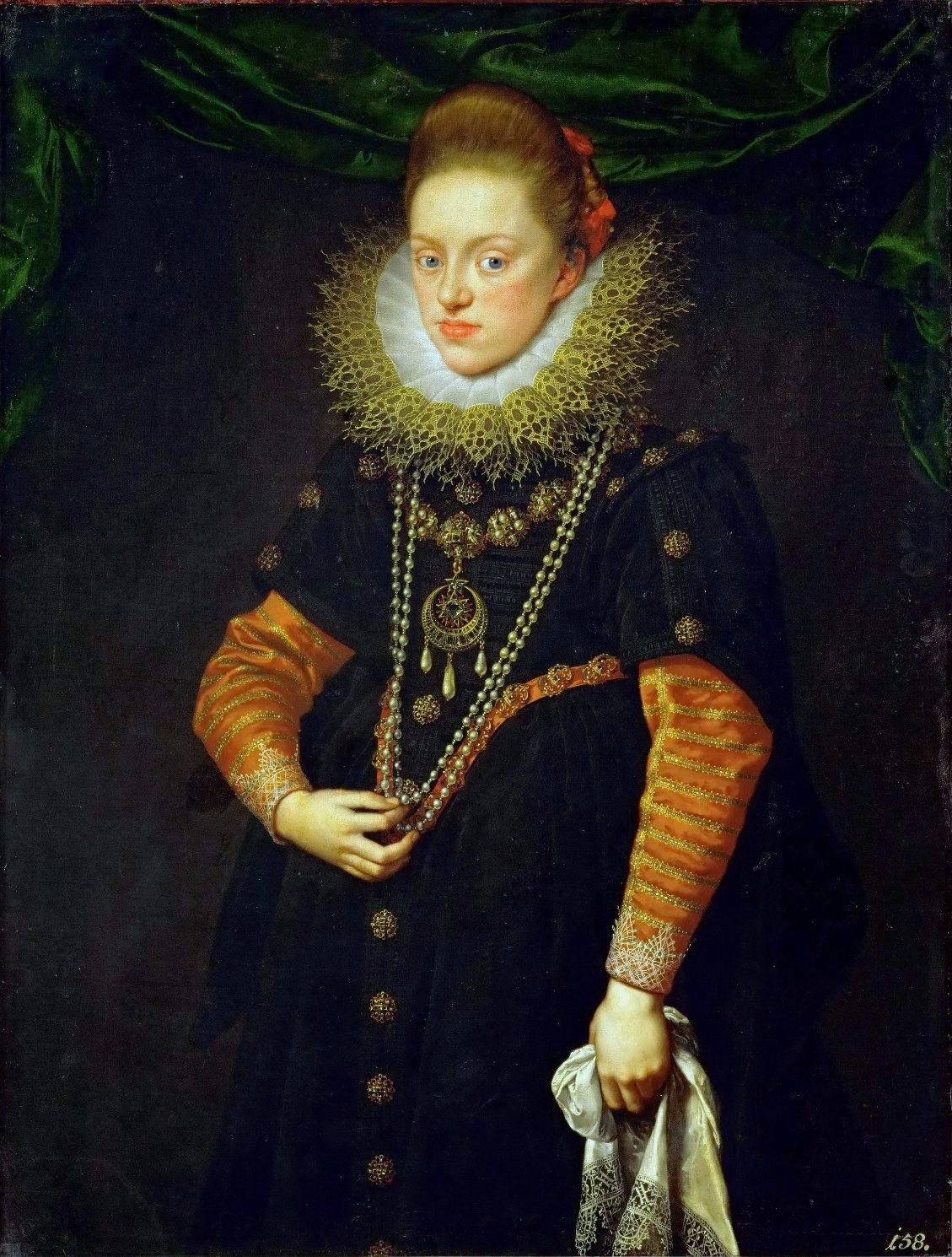
- Portrait c. 1603 by Frans Pourbus the Younger

Queen consort of Poland Grand Duchess consort of Lithuania
- Tenure: 11 December 1605 – 10 July 1631
- Coronation: 11 December 1605
- Born: 24 December 1588; Graz, Duchy of Styria, Holy Roman Empire
- Died: 10 July 1631 (aged 42); Warsaw, Crown of the Kingdom of Poland, Polish-Lithuanian Commonwealth
- Burial: Wawel Castle, Kraków, Poland
- Spouse: Sigismund III Vasa (m. 1605)
- Issue among others...: John II Casimir Vasa; John Albert Vasa; Charles Ferdinand, Duke of Opole; Alexander Charles Vasa; Anna Catherine Constance Vasa
- House: Habsburg
- Father: Charles II, Archduke of Austria
- Mother: Maria Anna of Bavaria
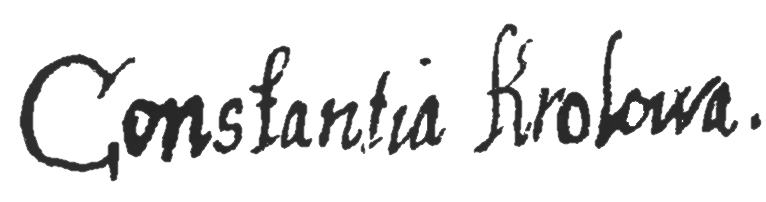
- Signature

Constance of Austria (German: Konstanza; Polish: Konstancja; Lithuanian: Konstancija; 24 December 1588 – 10 July 1631) was Queen of Poland and Grand Duchess of Lithuania as the second wife of King-Grand Duke Sigismund III Vasa and the mother of King John II Casimir.

== Biography ==
Constance was a daughter of Charles II of Austria and his niece, Maria Anna of Bavaria. Her paternal grandparents were Ferdinand I, Holy Roman Emperor and Anna of Bohemia and Hungary (1503–1547). Anna was the only daughter of King Vladislaus II of Bohemia and Hungary and his wife Anne de Foix. Her maternal grandparents were Albert V, Duke of Bavaria and Anne Habsburg of Austria.

Constance was also a younger sister of Ferdinand II, Holy Roman Emperor, Margaret of Austria, Leopold V of Austria and Anna of Austria.

Her older sister Anna was the first wife of King Sigismund III Vasa. After her death Constance and Sigismund were married on December 11, 1605.

=== Queen ===
Queen Constance was an ambitious politician. Immediately after the wedding, she made efforts to influence policy. She built a strong faction of followers by arranging marriages between her handmaidens and powerful nobles. She represented the interests of the Habsburg family in Poland, and influenced the appointments of positions in the court, government and church. Her closest confidant was Urszula Meyerin.

Constance was proficient in Spanish, Latin and Italian. She learned Polish after the wedding but rarely used it. She was very religious and went to Mass twice a day. She also was a patron of clerics, painters and architects. She financed the buildings of several palaces for her children, but she was also described as an economic person.

In 1623 Constance bought Żywiec from Mikołaj Komorowski, which was forbidden by law to the members of the royal family and caused misunderstandings with the Parliament. Some time later (in 1626) she made it forbidden for Jews to settle in the city (de non tolerandis Judaeis).

Constance wished to secure the succession of her own son to the throne rather than the son of her sister, but she did not succeed. She died of a heat stroke in 1631.

== Issue ==
She had seven children:

1. John Casimir (25 December 1607 – 14 January 1608).
2. John Casimir (22 March 1609 – 16 December 1672), who reigned during 1648–1668 as John II Casimir.
3. John Albert (25 June 1612 – 29 December 1634).
4. Charles Ferdinand (13 October 1613 – 9 May 1655).
5. Alexander Charles (4 November 1614 – 19 November 1634).
6. Anna Constance (26 January 1616 – 24 May 1616).
7. Anna Catherine Constance (7 August 1619 – 8 October 1651).

== Ancestors ==
Ancestors of Constance of Austria

8. Philip I of Castile
4. Ferdinand I, Holy Roman Emperor (=14)
9. Joanna of Castile
2. Charles II of Austria
10. Vladislas II of Bohemia and Hungary
5. Anna of Bohemia and Hungary (=15)
11. Anna of Foix-Candale
1. Constance of Austria
12. William IV, Duke of Bavaria
6. Albert V, Duke of Bavaria
13. Marie of Baden-Sponheim
3. Maria Anna of Bavaria
14. Ferdinand I, Holy Roman Emperor (= 4)
7. Anna of Austria
15. Anna of Bohemia and Hungary (= 5)

== Gallery ==
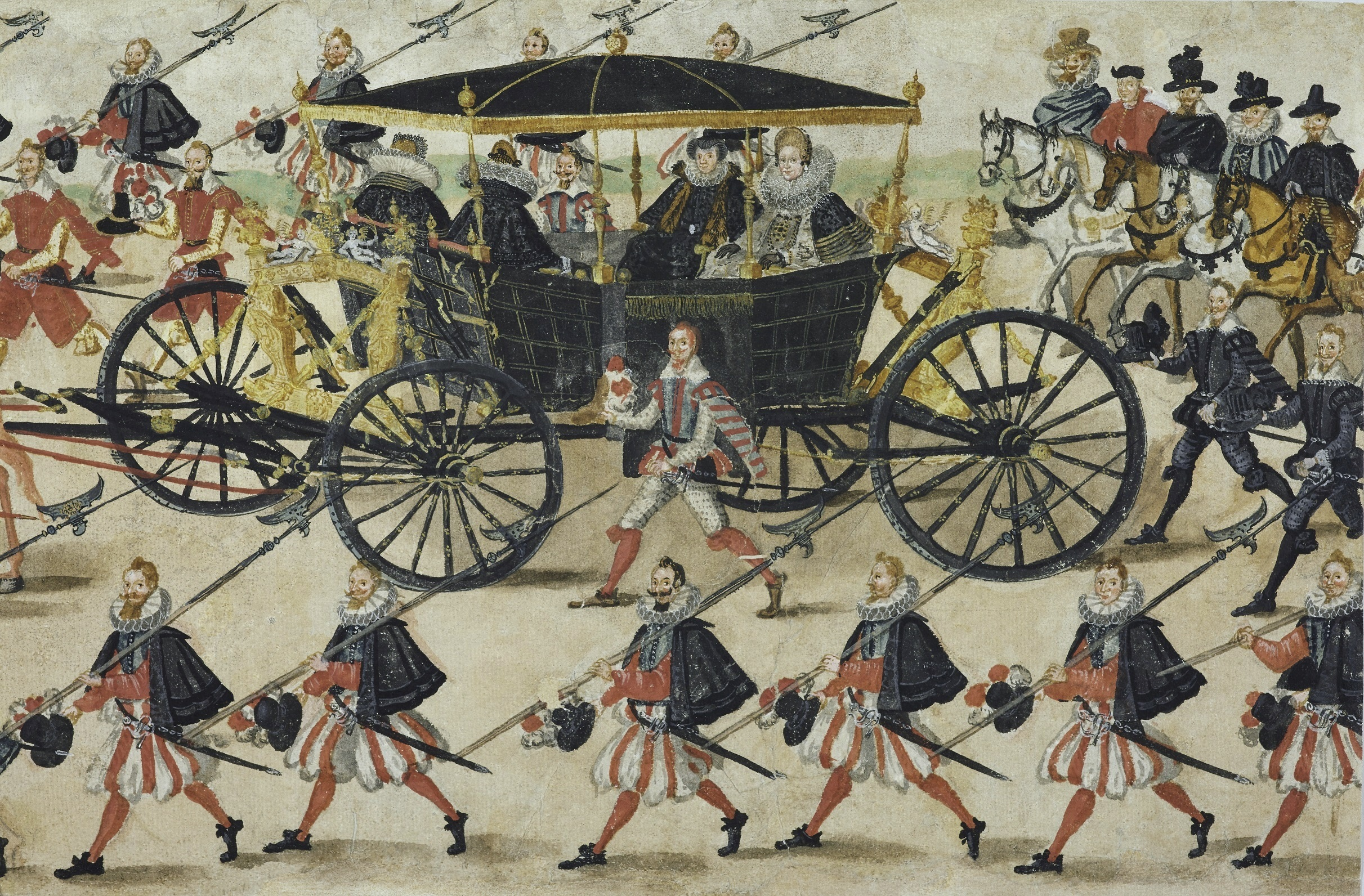
Entry of the Wedding Procession of Constance of Austria into Kraków in 1605.

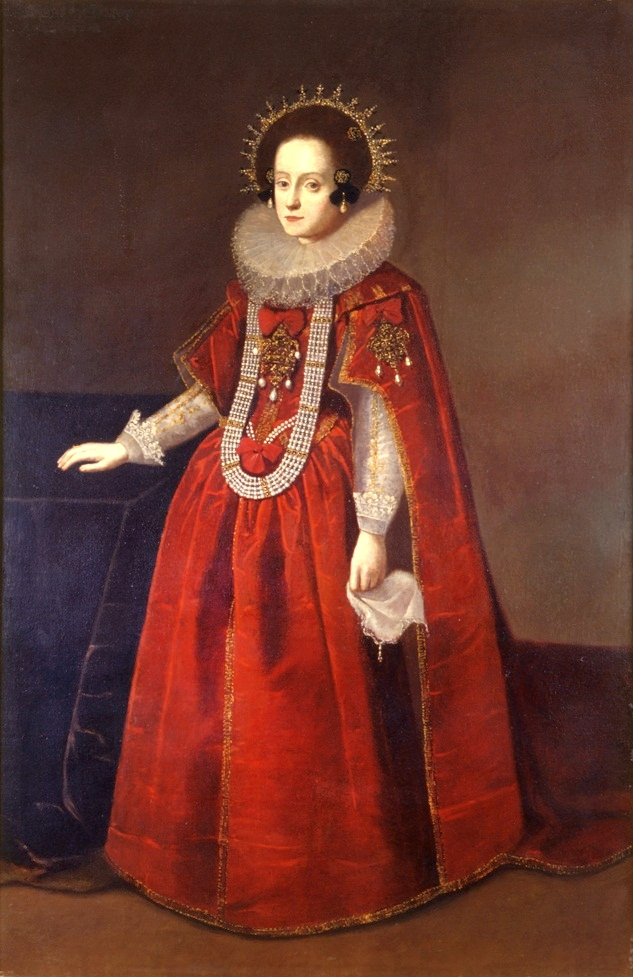
Constance of Austria in Spanish dress (saya), portraited by the court painter in 1610.

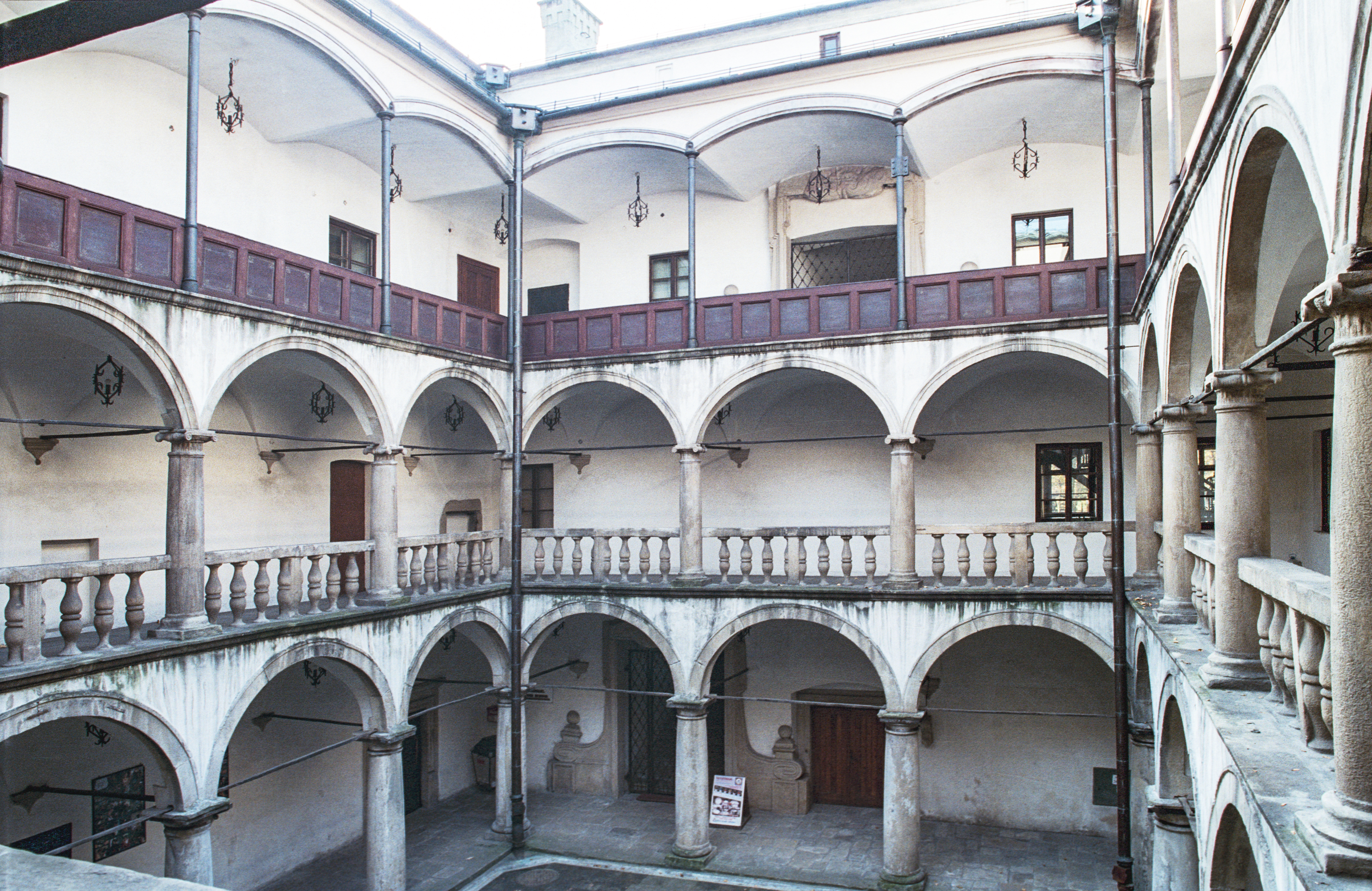
She enhanced and renovated the Castle in Żywiec, where she resided from 1624.

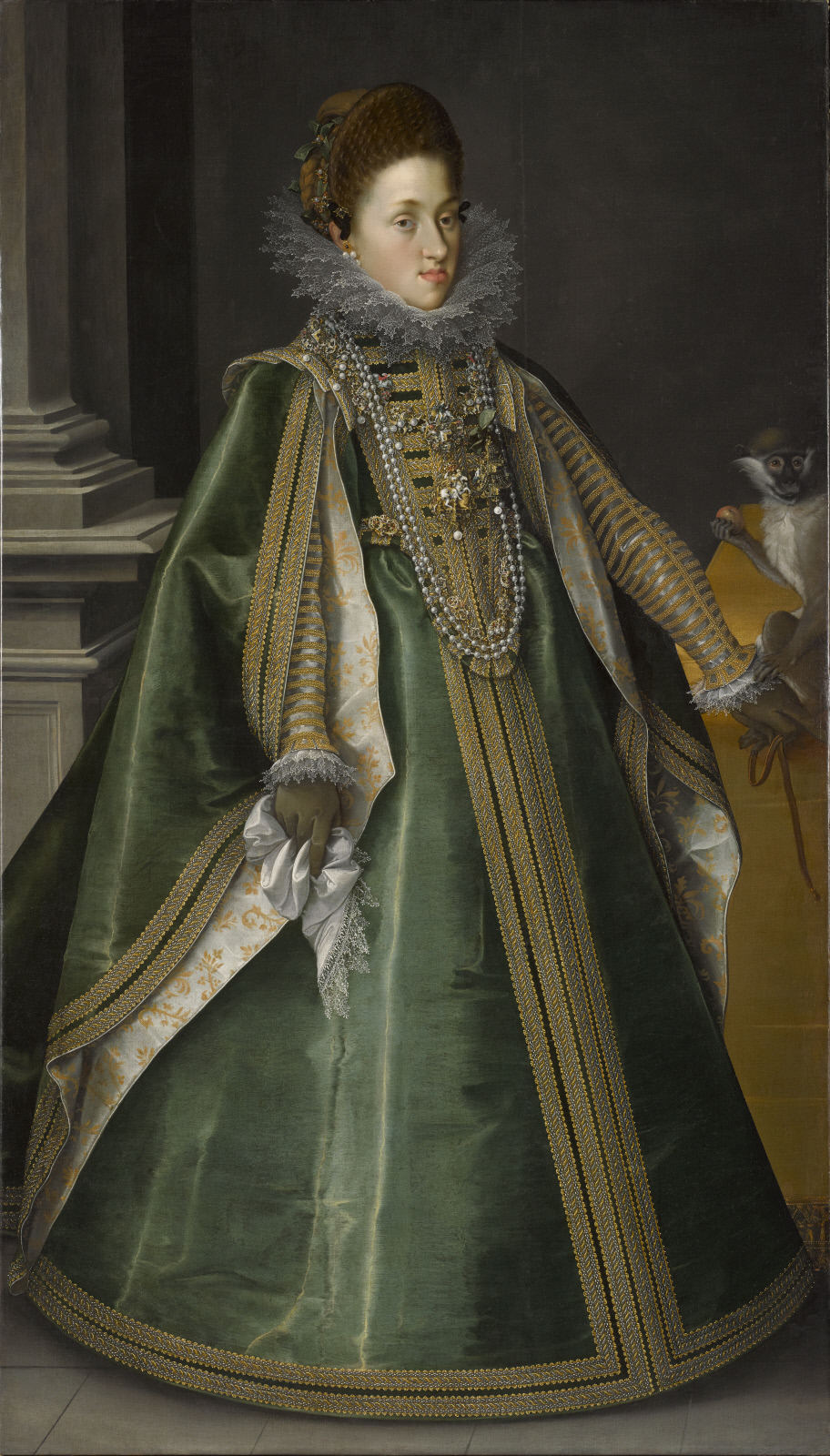
Constance of Austria as Queen consort of Poland and Grand Duchess consort of Lithuania.

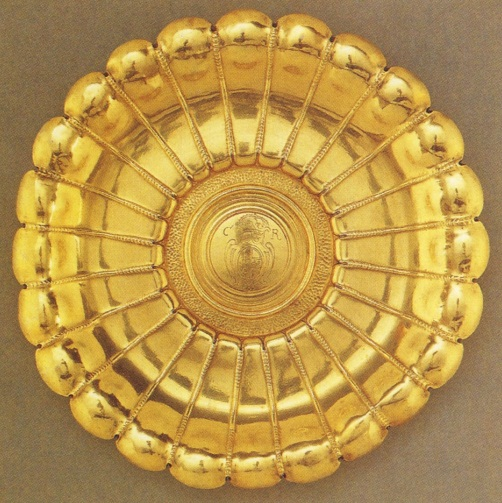
Silver-gilt plate, 1605, from Constance's dinner service

== See also ==
- Urszula Meyerin
- Golub-Dobrzyń

Constance of Austria House of Habsburg Born: 24 December 1588 Died: 10 July 1631
Royal titles
Preceded by Anna of Austria	Queen consort of Poland; Grand Duchess consort of Lithuania; 1605–1631	Succeeded by Cecilia Renata of Austria
