= Urszula Meyerin =

Influential Polish courtier (1570–1635)

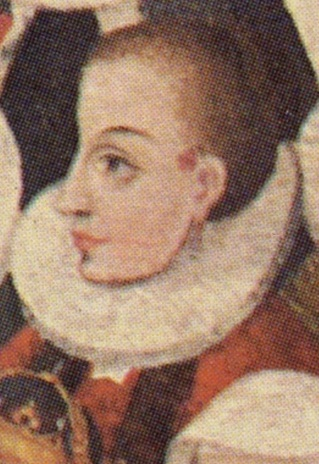
- Alleged portrait of Urszula Meyerin, 1599
- Born: 1570 near Munich, Duchy of Bavaria
- Died: 1635 (aged 64–65); Warsaw, Poland
- Mother: Anna

Urszula Meyerin (also, Meierin; 1570–1635) was a politically influential Polish courtier and mistress to King Sigismund III of Poland. Her real surname may have been Gienger (or Gienger von Grünbüchl), but that remains in dispute; she signed her letters Ursula Meyerin. In the German language, that surname means something along the lines of "chamberlain", "administrator", or "manager".

== Early life ==
Urszula was most likely born near Munich in Duchy of Bavaria, in a poor noble family. She was the daughter of Anna, a Bavarian burgher lady, and who was likely one of the Habsburgs. Meyerin came to Graz as a child in the 1580s. She was pretty in her youth, and some time later was chosen by Maria Anna of Bavaria to become mistress to King Sigismund III of Poland. Maria Anna's own daughter (Anna of Habsburg) was fiancée to the Polish King, but was unattractive, and the Habsburgs had bad experiences with two marriages of King Sigismund Augustus of Poland. The girl joined Anne's court in Poland as a chamberlain in 1592.

== Chamberlain ==
A devout Catholic, Urszula had considerable influence on the King and Queen. Shortly after her arrival in the Polish–Lithuanian Commonwealth, she acquired knowledge of Polish and became involved in the affairs of state which made her very unpopular. Meyerin used her influence on the King to appoint her favourites to state positions. As a result, she was contemptuously called King's mistress, minister in a skirt and Jesuit's bigotry. The King's secretary Jan Szczęsny Herburt called her "obscene favourite".

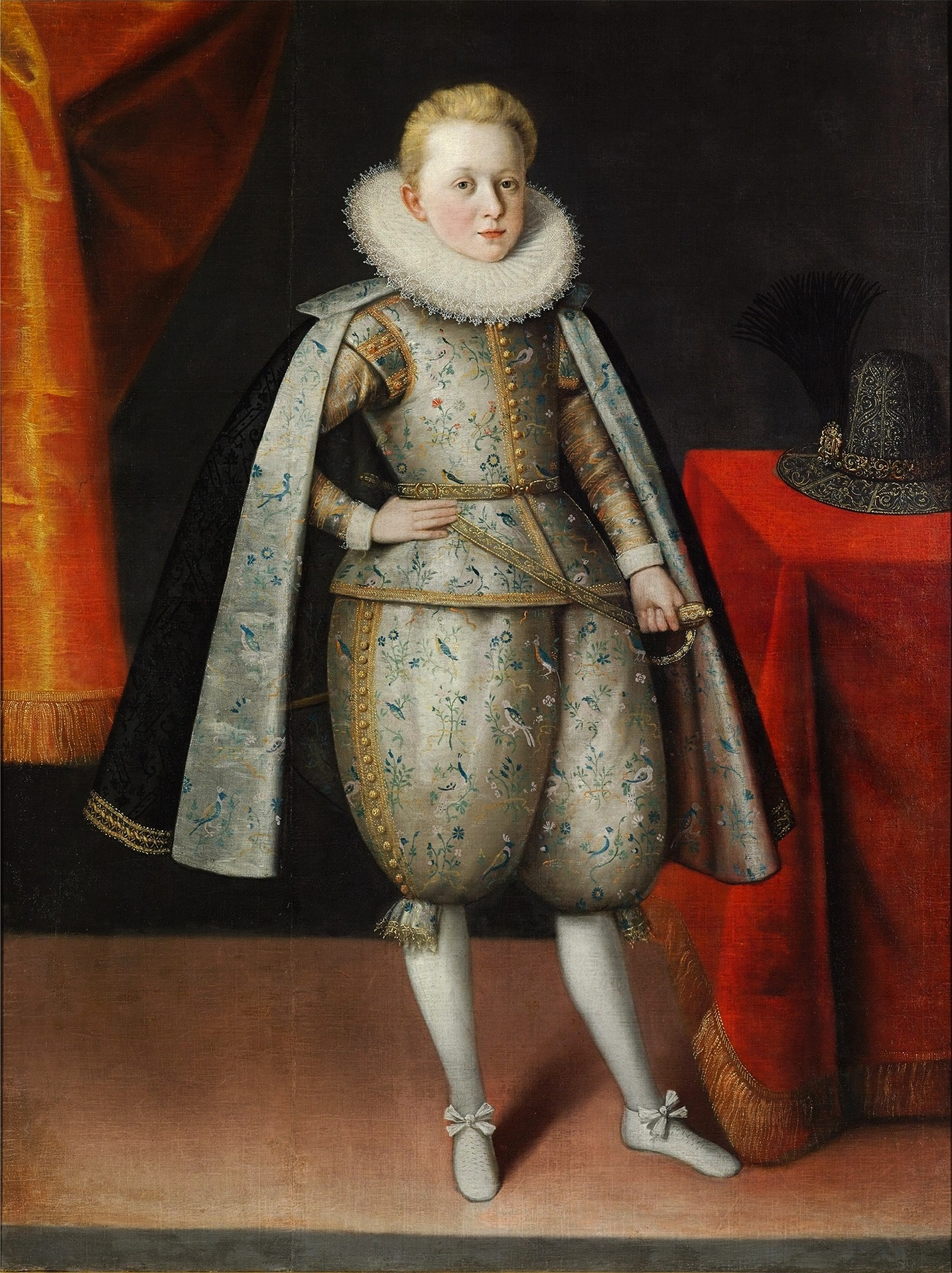
Prince Władysław Sigismund Vasa, c. 1605.

Meyerin was a chamberlain (Polish: Ochmistrzyni) of the Queen's court. Though she became the senior governess to the King's children and supervisor of Royal Nurses, she was not held in high esteem among them (Urszula was especially loathed by a protestant nurse of prince Władysław, Scottish Mrs. Forbes). After the Queen's death in 1598, she did not leave Poland, as did the other German Queen's ladies. This was due to her great attachment to the King and to young prince Władysław. Her tender letters to the prince are sometimes interpreted to contain more than a tutor's affection.

In her constant correspondence with the Archduchess Maria she reported in details the life of King Sigismund and his court. I've never seen a man who would cry so much she reported on May 19, 1598, describing the monarch bidding farewell to his children before leaving for Sweden. As noted Stanisław Kobierzycki, she replaced the deceased Queen, since she was not unpleasant to the King (as wrote Archduchess Maria Anna).

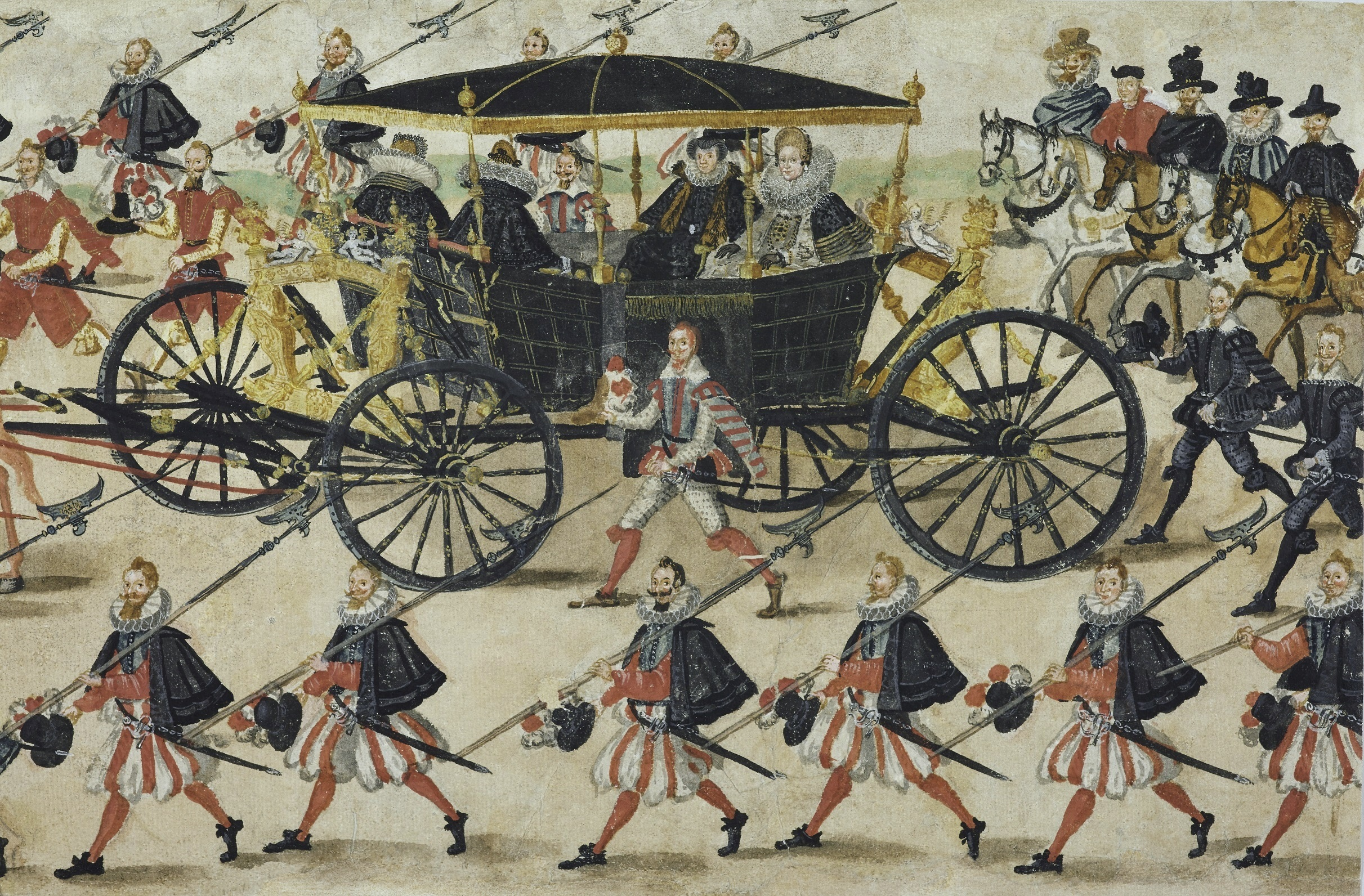
Constance of Austria and her mother Maria Anna of Bavaria during entrance into Kraków, c.1605.

When Sigismund III married again in 1605 in Kraków with a sister of his first wife, Constance of Austria, Urszula became her "close worries and consolations participant". She traveled in the Queen's carriage, dined with her at the same table, administered the court's treasury, and even assisted with official audiences with the King. Meyerin fostered the King's children and spoke to them mainly in Polish (their own mother communicated with them only in German). She never married and rejected all offers (even her great friend Albrycht Stanisław Radziwiłł).

As a chamberlain she was very thrifty and dressed mainly in a black Spanish dress. She corresponded with Emperor Ferdinand II and the Pope and received a Golden Rose for an "exceptionally virtuous life". In 1617, during Władysław's expedition against Russia to regain the tsar's throne, he asked of her intervention in favour of Marcin Kazanowski who came into dispute with the Grand Hetman of Lithuania, Jan Karol Chodkiewicz.

During the last year of Sigismund's life, he was often seriously ill, and Urszula became the real Polish Duke of Lerma, leaving him an increasingly peripheral figure. She signed official state documents instead of the King, and received foreign ambassadors. After the King's death in 1632, the imperial diplomat Arnoldin Mathias von Clarstein who came to Warsaw turned with his requests first to Urszula, who promised to support him in his efforts to obtain a loan. When Urszula was frightened by the sum demanded, Prince Władysław unexpectedly entered the audience chambers of the deceased King, he found us sitting together, smiled and asked me if it's not the right time for us to deal with the matter on the outside, in the winter garden, as long as uberius coram de quo.

Urszula died in 1635 at the Royal Castle, and was buried in the Jesuit Church in Warsaw with a solemn burial ceremony, almost like a Queen. Her grave was plundered and destroyed by Swedish and German troops during the Deluge in the 1650s.

== Legacy ==
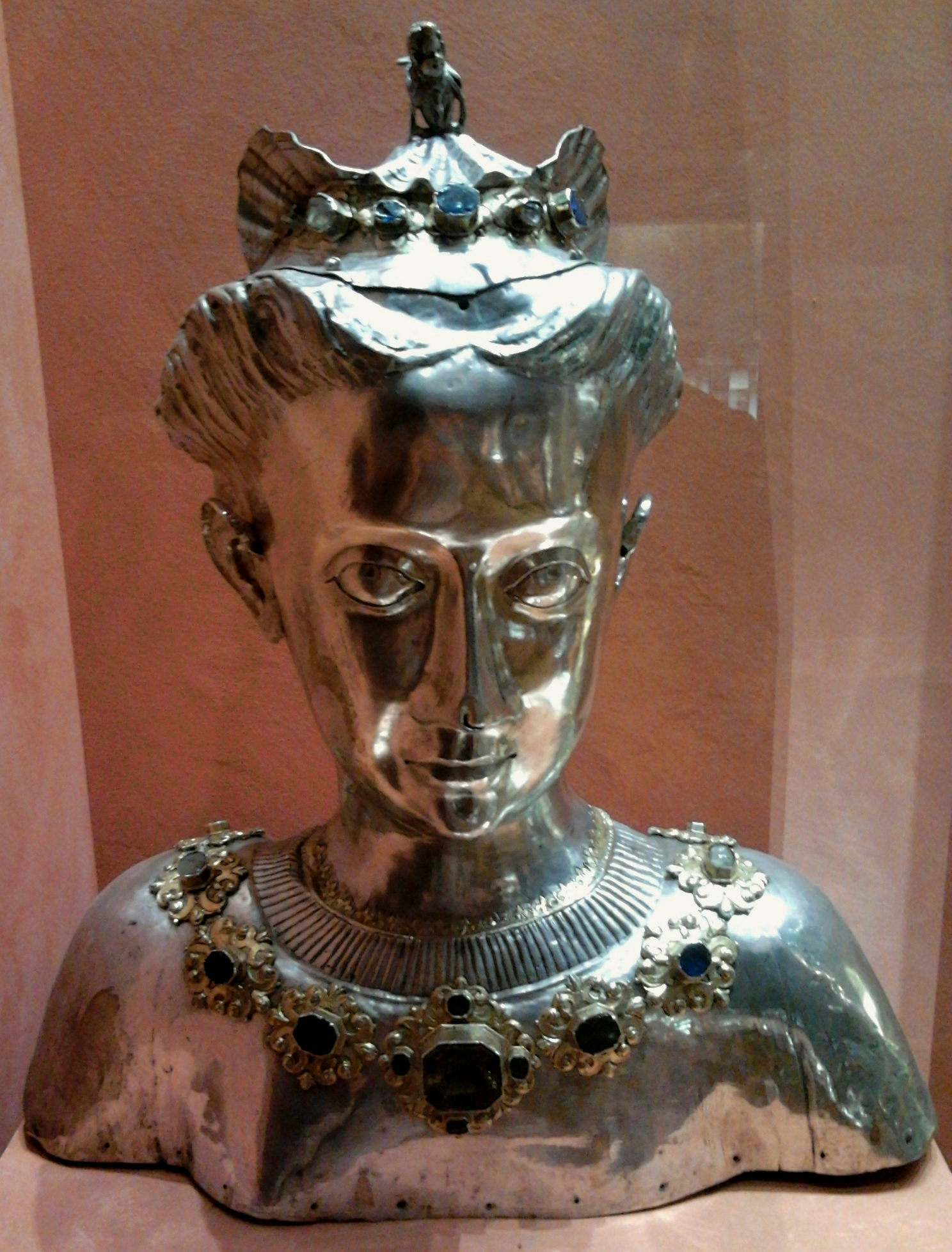
Silver reliquary of Saint Ursula by Stanisław Ditrich, ca. 1600, Diocesan Museum in Płock. It most probably bears the features of mistress of Sigismund III Vasa.

Urszula Meyerin died childless. All her effigies, including some by such great artists as Peter Claesz. Soutman or Christian Melich (Polish court painters), were destroyed when the Royal Castle in Warsaw was ransacked and burned down during the Deluge. A few months before her death, Władysław Vasa commissioned a painting, in which she sat in the middle of all the descendants of King Sigismund III, as a guide and guardian of the Vasa family. The canvas had semi-private character and expressed the idea Familia vasorum. It is believed that one of the ladies in the painting Adoration of Our Lady of the Rosary from Sandomierz (1599) depicts Urszula Meyerin. But it is more likely the mature blonde dressed according to Imperial court fashion and facing the King to represent Sigismund's mistress who was almost 30 at that time, than the effigy of a youth brunette in Polish costume as it is supposed.

== See also ==
- Marina Mniszech
- Elżbieta Sieniawska
- Izabela Czartoryska
