= Marcin Szyszkowski =

Polish priest

Marcin II Szyszkowski
- Bishop of Kraków
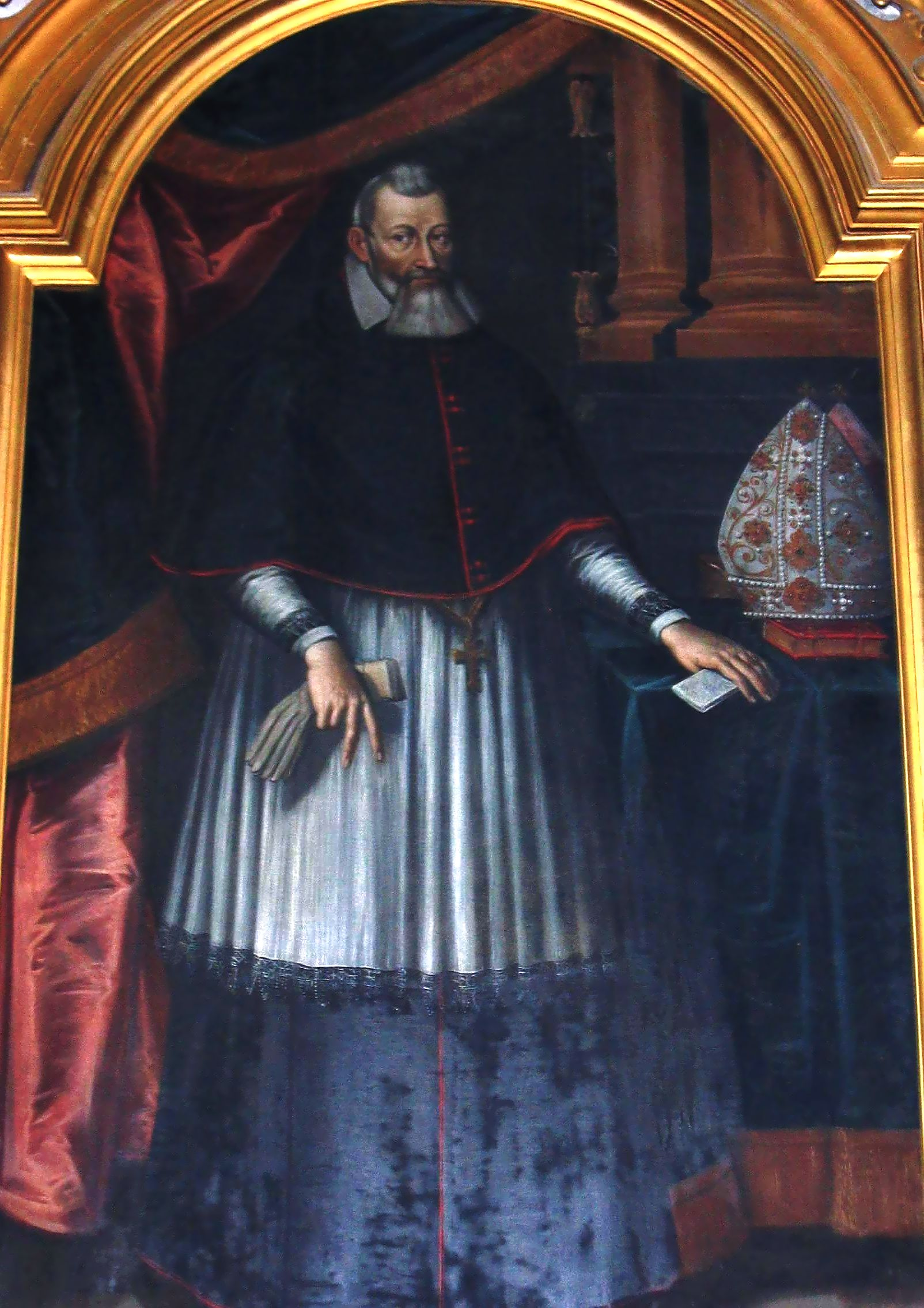
- Church: Catholic Church
- Diocese: Diocese of Kraków
- In office: 17 October 1616 – 30 April 1630
- Predecessor: Piotr Tylicki
- Successor: Andrzej Lipski
- Previous posts: Bishop of Płock (1607-1616); Bishop of Lutsk (1604-1607); Titular Bishop of Christopolis (1603-1604); Coadjutor Bishop of Lutsk (1603-1604)

Orders
- Consecration: 9 May 1604 by Bernard Maciejowski

Personal details
- Born: 1554 Iłża, Sandomierz Voivodeship, Kingdom of Poland
- Died: 30 April 1630 (aged 75–76)

Marcin II Szyszkowski of Clan Ostoja (1554 – 30 April 1630) was a notable Polish priest who attended the Jesuit school of Kalisz and became bishop of Lutsk, Płock and finally of Kraków. By virtue of his office as Bishop of Kraków, he also became Prince of Siewierz.

== Life and education ==
Ostoja

Szyszkowski was born into a noble family which was part of the Clan of Ostoja. After finishing Jesuit school, he furthermore studied in Kraków, Rome, Bologna and Padua. His great intellect and humanistic view helped him advance quickly. He became chancellor of Piotr Myszkowski, who was bishop of Kraków at the time, and he quickly advanced to the office of Bishop of Luck in 1604, the holy Catholic capital in the area named Christopolis.

On 18 November 1607 he became the Bishop of Płock. He translated a lot of work from Italian to Latin, and founded a Jesuit school in Płock in the year 1616. He finished the building of the Bishop Palace and in Pultusk; he also rebuilt the town castle, and opened a college for poor students.

Szyszkowki moved to Kraków in October 1616 and became Bishop of Kraków on 3 June 1617. During his time as the Bishop of Kraków he opened several schools, churches, and chapels for the Franciscan friars. He was against the reforms and in his battle to preserve the Catholic Church he regained 37 churches for the cause. In the cathedral on Wawel in Kraków, present confession is in the form of a domed canopy made of black and rose marble, gilt-bronze and wood, which was created in the years 1626-1629 on Bishop Marcin Szyszkowski's foundation.

The most popular sarcophaguses in the 17th century were in the form of busts of the deceased persons, in a style taking its origins from Rome. Four Baroque statues of the bishops of Cracow including Marcin Szyszkowski (made of black marble by Jan Trevano) were placed around St Stanislaus' confession standing over the crypt in which the bishops are buried.

== See also ==
- Mikołaj Szyszkowski

== Sources ==
- Nowowiejski A. J., Płock. Monografia historyczna...., Płock 1990
- Piotr Nitecki, Biskupi Kościoła w Polsce w latach 965 - 1999, ISBN 83-211-1311-7, Warsaw 2000.
- Krzysztof Rafał Prokop: Sylwetki biskupów łuckich. Biały Dunajec: Ostróg : "Wołanie z Wołynia", 2001. ISBN 83-911918-7-7.
