= Mikołaj Szyszkowski =

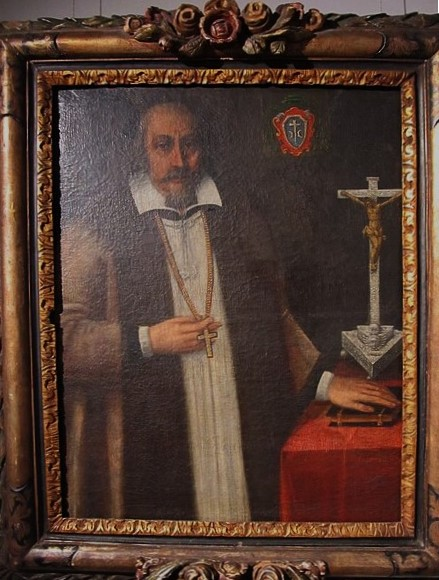
Bishop Mikołaj Szyszkowski

Mikołaj Szyszkowski (1590–1643) of Clan Ostoja was a Prince-bishop of Warmia from 1633 until his death in 1643.

Ostoja

Born around 1590, he was the son of Jan and Anna nee Ujejska. He began his studies (in the fields of theology and philosophy) in Braniewo (Braunsberg), and continued them abroad, in Rome. He received the Holy Orders from his relative, Prince of Sieradz and bishop of Płock, Marcin Szyszkowski, and also because of his relative he got holdings ('beneficja') in Czerwińsk (where he was an abbot) and elsewhere. In the royal court of the Polish king Sigismund III Vasa he achieved the official rank of Great Secretary, and it was then that he became a colleague of Stefan Sadorski. After the death of his relative, bishop Marcin (who in time advanced from the position of Bishop of Płock to the Bishop of Kraków) managed the Kraków Bishopry for two years.

In 1632 he became a member of the Warmian chapter, and with the support of the new king of the Polish–Lithuanian Commonwealth, Władysław IV Waza, in 1633 he was chosen to become Prince-Bishop of Warmia. As Frombork (Frauenburg ) was occupied by the Swedes, he resided in Lidzbark Warmiński (Heilsberg). After the end of the hostilities with Sweden, he funded a new church in Stoczek Klasztorny, a town 11 km east of Lidzbark Warmiński, founded in 1349 by Warmian bishop Hermann von Prag. Stoczek Klasztorny, founded at a spring, became popular with pilgrims and the church dedicated to Mary as the spring of peace. He restarted the seminary in Braniewo and spent much of his personal funds reconstructing churches and monasteries damaged in the recent fighting. Working together with George William of Brandenburg, he issued a new set of laws regulating economic life. Similar laws were enacted in Ducal Prussia.

Prince-Bishop Szyszkowski, known to also use the title of 'Bishop of Sambia' (biskup sambijski) was also known as the protector of Catholics in Ducal Prussia. He died on 7 February in Lidzbark Warmiński and was buried in the cathedral in Frombork.

The Stoczek Klasztorny church dedicated to Mary was elevated to a 'Basilica Minor' in 1997.

== See also ==
- Ostoja coat of arms
- Clan of Ostoja
- Marcin Szyszkowski

Catholic Church titles
Regnal titles
Preceded by John Albert Vasa	Prince-Bishop of Warmia (Ermland); 1633–1643	Succeeded by Jan Karol Konopacki
