= Stefan Sadorski =

Polish courtier, politician and a diplomat

Stefan Sadorski (1581 – 2 July 1640) was a courtier, politician and a diplomat of the Polish–Lithuanian Commonwealth. He was a Polish noble (member of szlachta).

In the royal court of the Polish king Sigismund III Vasa he achieved the official rank of Great Secretary, and it was then that he became a colleague of bishops of Warmia Szymon Rudnicki and Mikołaj Szyszkowski. He served in that capacity for Sigismund, and after his death, for Władysław IV Waza. He was particularly active in the northern realms of the Commonwealth, often being an envoy of the Polish king to the Duchy of Prussia.
