= Łyna (river) =

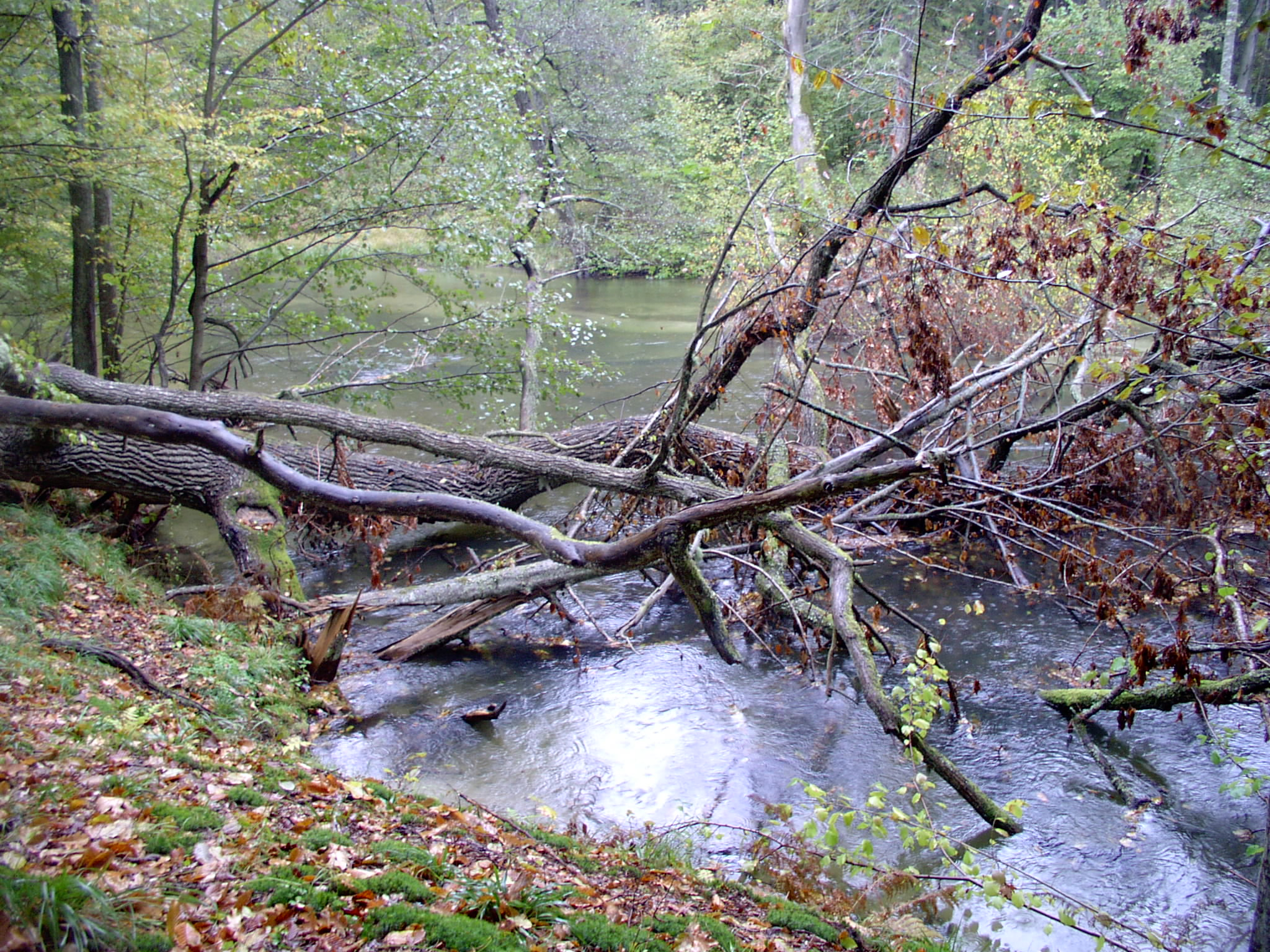
- The Łyna River near Olsztyn

Location
- Country: Poland, Russia

Physical characteristics
- Source
  - location: Łyna (village)
  - coordinates: 53°26′28″N 20°24′49″E
- Mouth
  - location: Pregolya
  - coordinates: 54.6208°N 21.2267°E
- Length: 264 km (164 mi)
- Basin size: 7,126 km^{2} (2,751 sq mi)

Basin features
- Progression: Pregolya→ Baltic Sea
- Landmarks: Olsztyn Castle; Lidzbark Castle

The Łyna (Polish pronunciation: [ˈwɨna]; German: Alle [ˈalə]; Lithuanian: Alna; Russian: Ла́ва - Lava), is a river that begins in northern Poland's Warmian-Masurian Voivodeship and ends in Russia's Kaliningrad Oblast.

The Łyna is a tributary of the Pregolya River, and has a total length of 264 km (207 km in Poland and 57 km in Russia) and a basin area of 7,126 km² (5,298 km² in Poland). It is connected to Lake Mamry by the 18th-century Masurian Canal.

The river's source is located near the village of Łyna in Masuria, Poland. It then flows through the regions of Warmia, Bartia and Nadrovia.

== History ==
In historical terms, the river fell within the area of the medieval Monastic state of the Teutonic Knights established in the 13th century. In 1454, the adjacent territory was incorporated by King Casimir IV Jagiellon to the Kingdom of Poland upon the request of the anti-Teutonic Prussian Confederation. It was confirmed as part of Poland after the subsequent Thirteen Years' War, the longest of all Polish–Teutonic wars, ended in 1466. Following the First Partition of Poland in 1772, the area was annexed by Prussia and made part of the newly formed province of East Prussia in 1773, which from 1871 was also part of Germany. Following Germany's defeat in World War II, in 1945, it was split between Poland and the Soviet Union in accordance with border changes promulgated at the Potsdam Conference.

== Cities and towns ==
The largest city located on the Łyna is Olsztyn, Poland. Cities and towns along the Łyna include:

- Olsztyn
- Dobre Miasto
- Lidzbark Warmiński
- Bartoszyce
- Sępopol
- Pravdinsk
- Znamensk
