= Szymon Rudnicki (bishop) =

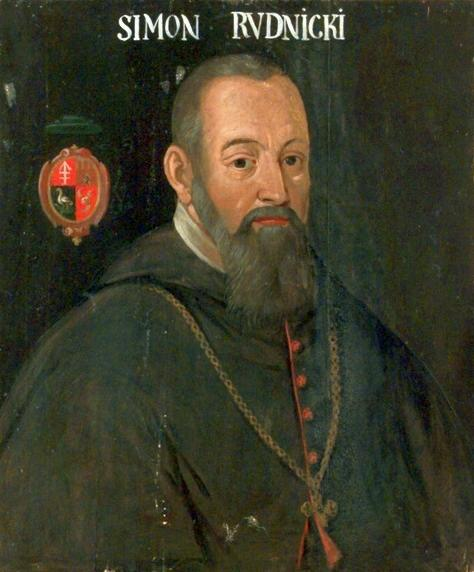
- Church: Latin Church
- Diocese: Warmia
- Other post: Apostolic Administrator of the Sambia Diocese

Personal details
- Born: 20 October 1552 Rzeczyca near Sieradz, Poland
- Died: 4 July 1621 (aged 68) Lidzbark Warmiński
- Denomination: Catholicism
- Education: Jagiellonian University, University of Bologna
- Coat of arms

Szymon Rudnicki of the Lis coat of arms (born 20 October 1552, died 4 July 1621) – Bishop of Warmia from 1604 to 1621, Apostolic Administrator of the Sambia Diocese, Great Secretary of the Crown from 1601, provost of the Poznań Cathedral Chapter from 1600 to 1605, scholastic of the Łęczyca collegiate chapter, canon of Kraków, Warmia, and Poznań, and Royal Secretary at the courts of Stephen Báthory and Sigismund III Vasa.

== Biography ==
Szymon Rudnicki was born on 20 October 1552 in Rzeczyca. He began his education in Kalisz, later studying in Kraków, Bologna, and Rome. In Rome, he spent several years at the court of Cardinal Stanisław Hozjusz. In Poland, he worked at the court of King Stephen Báthory, and later Sigismund III Vasa. Working in the royal chancellery, he served as a royal secretary and later as the Great Secretary of the Crown. During this time, he received several ecclesiastical benefices, including a canonry in the Warmia Chapter. After the election of Bishop Piotr Tylicki to the Kuyavia bishopric, he took his place in the Warmia Diocese.

He was a deputy of the Poznań Cathedral Chapter to the Crown Tribunal in 1600, and in 1613, he was appointed a resident senator.

Rudnicki did not know German but was fluent in Latin. He conducted visitations of dozens of parishes. He was a founder of sacred buildings and scholarships. In 1611, he consecrated the chapel of the Katarzynki sisters in Braniewo, in 1616 he consecrated a church in Königsberg, in 1617 he reclaimed the Church of St. Nicholas in Elbląg for Catholics, and in 1619 he consecrated a chapel in Święta Lipka.

Rudnicki visited Königsberg several times as a royal and Crown commissioner in matters of enforcing the rights of the Prussian estates in Ducal Prussia and the obligations of the Prussian fief. He maintained lively social contacts with John Sigismund, who visited Lidzbark Warmiński and Łaniewo, the episcopal game reserve.

As bishop, Rudnicki obtained a papal decree granting the title of Bishop of Sambia to the Bishops of Warmia. He also reformed the liturgy, eliminating Warmian liturgical peculiarities, and in 1616 published synodal statutes in print.

Rudnicki died on 4 July 1621 in Lidzbark Warmiński. He was buried in the cathedral in Frombork.

Thirty letters to Szymon Rudnicki from Sigismund III Vasa were held in the collections of the Załuski Library in Warsaw. Evacuated with the entire library to Saint Petersburg, they were stored in the Imperial Public Library (call number: Collectio Autographorum 215). Recovered from the Soviet Union in the 1920s, they enriched the collections of the National Library in Warsaw. In 1944, they were burned by the Germans.

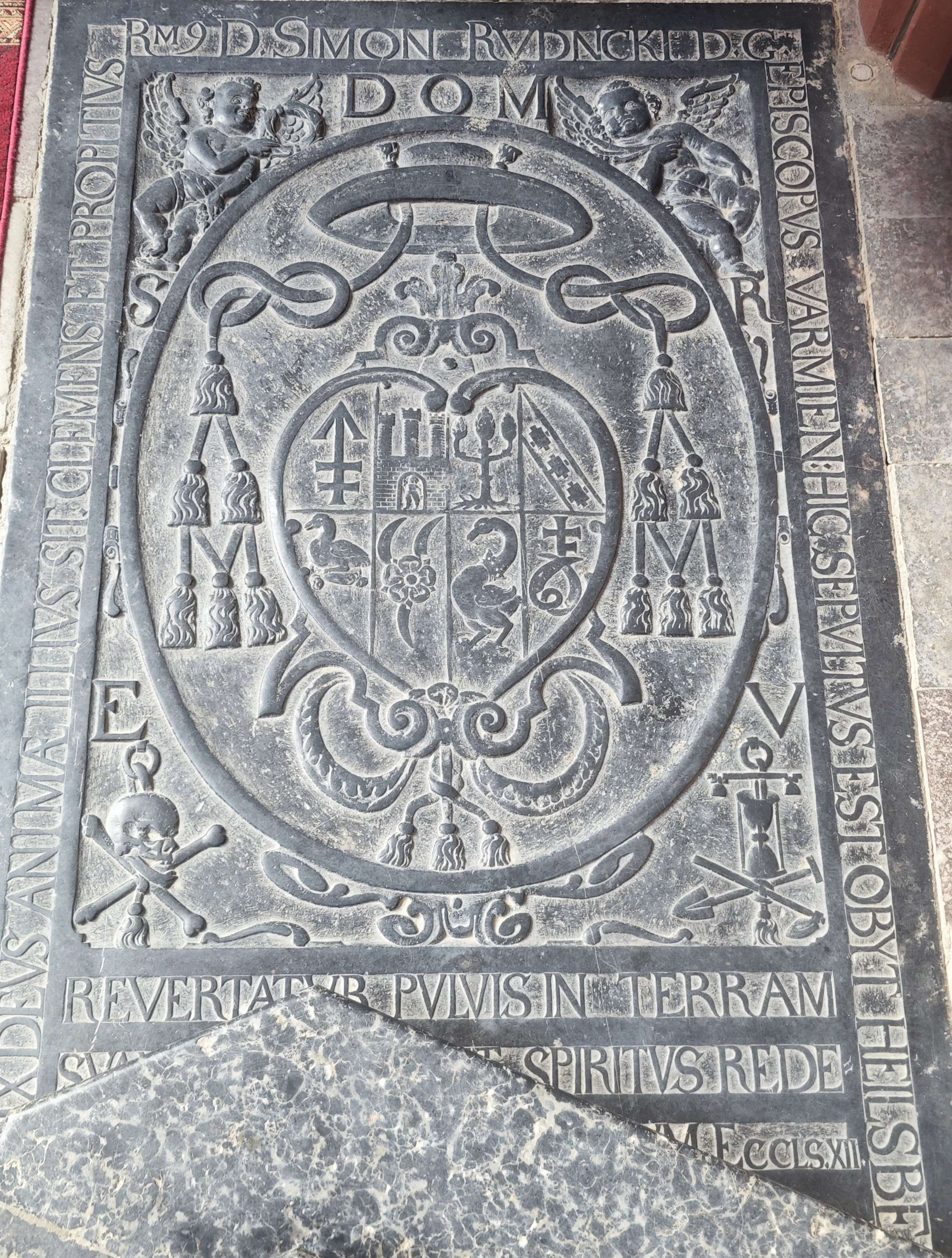
Tombstone in the cathedral in Frombork

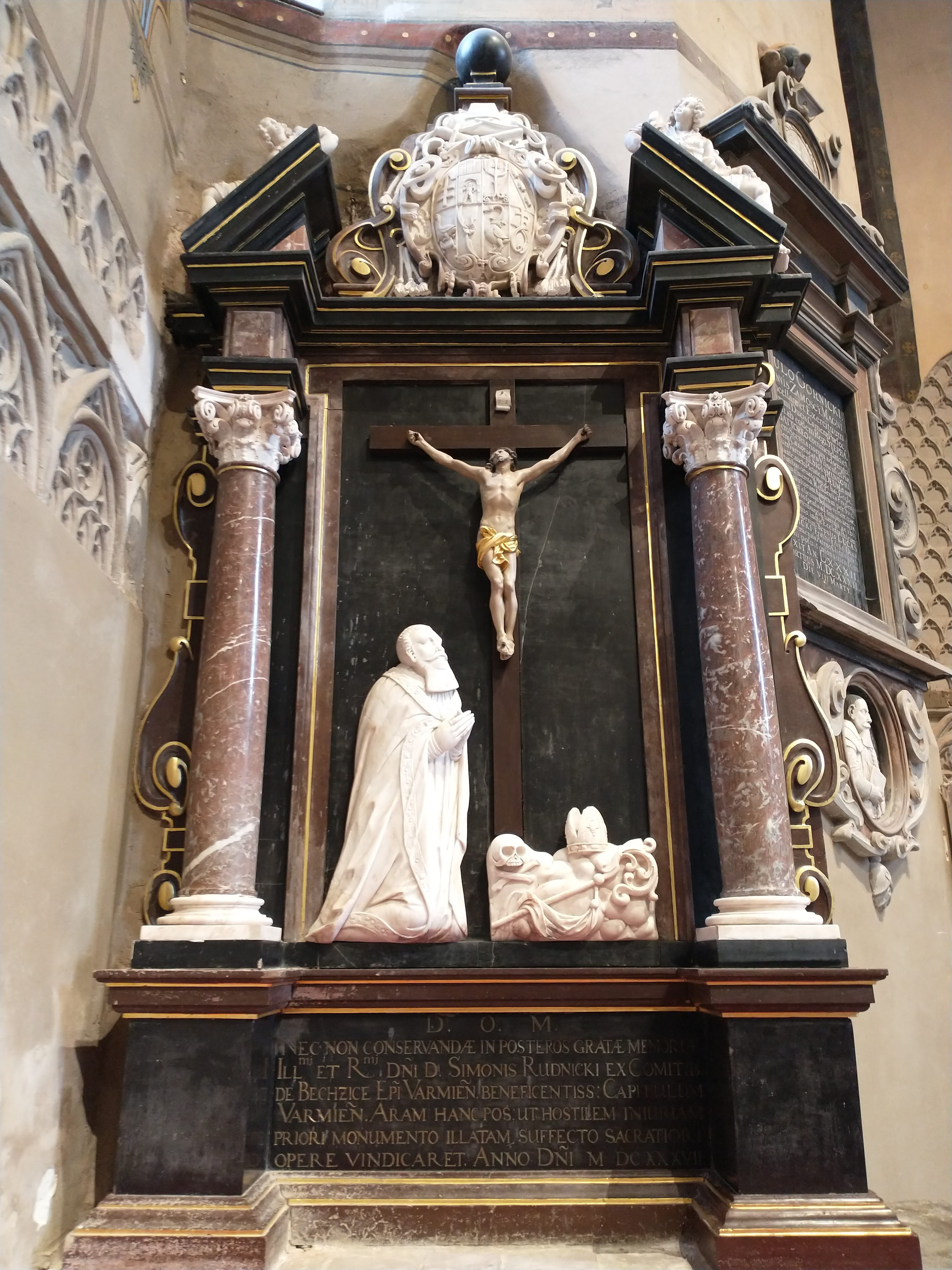
Altar of St. Anthony with an epitaph in honor of the bishop in the cathedral

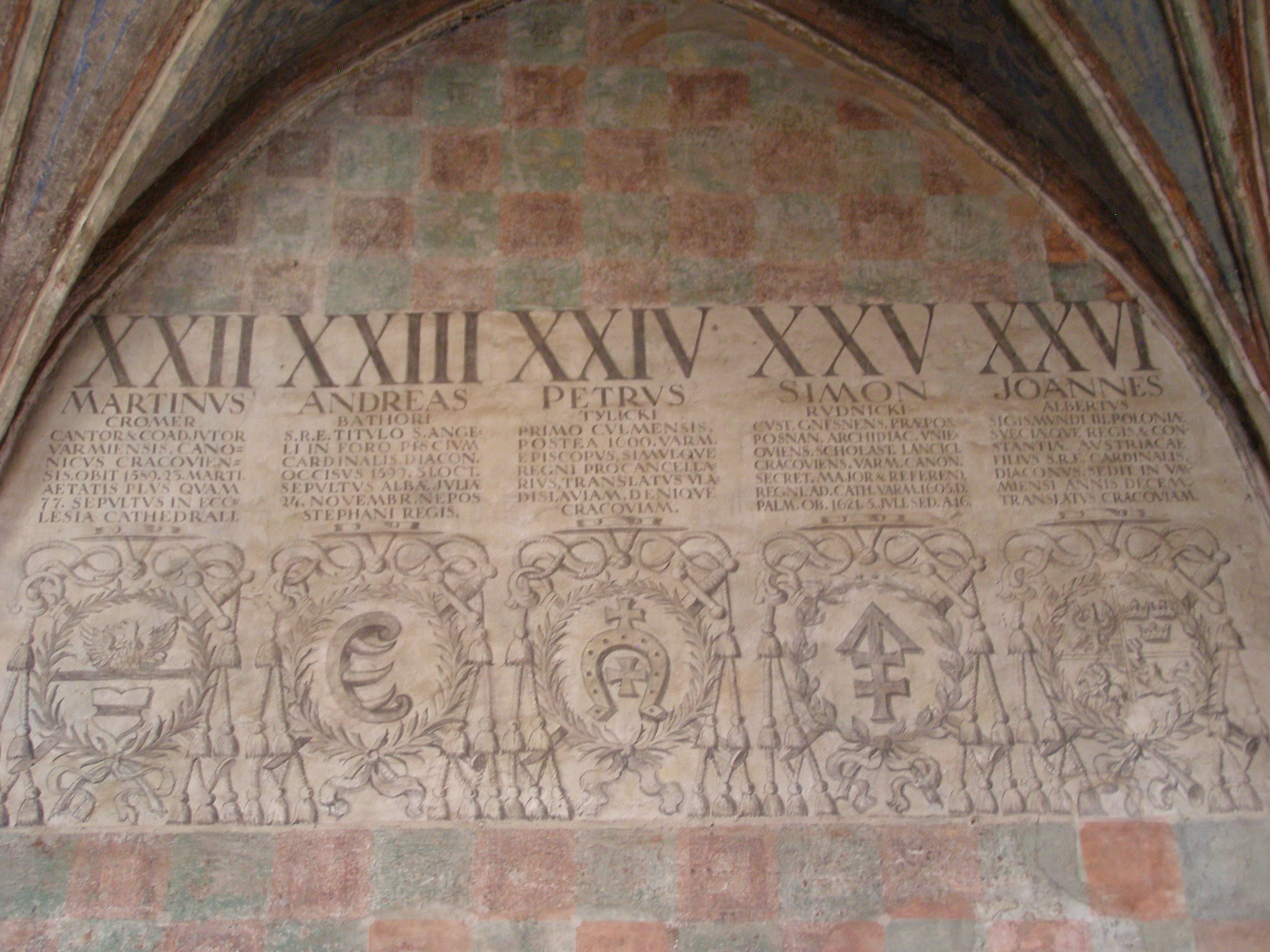
Coat of arms of Bishop Rudnicki in the castle of the Warmia bishops; gallery of bishops (fragment): Marcin Kromer, Andrzej Batory, Piotr Tylicki, Szymon Rudnicki (fourth from the left), Jan Albert

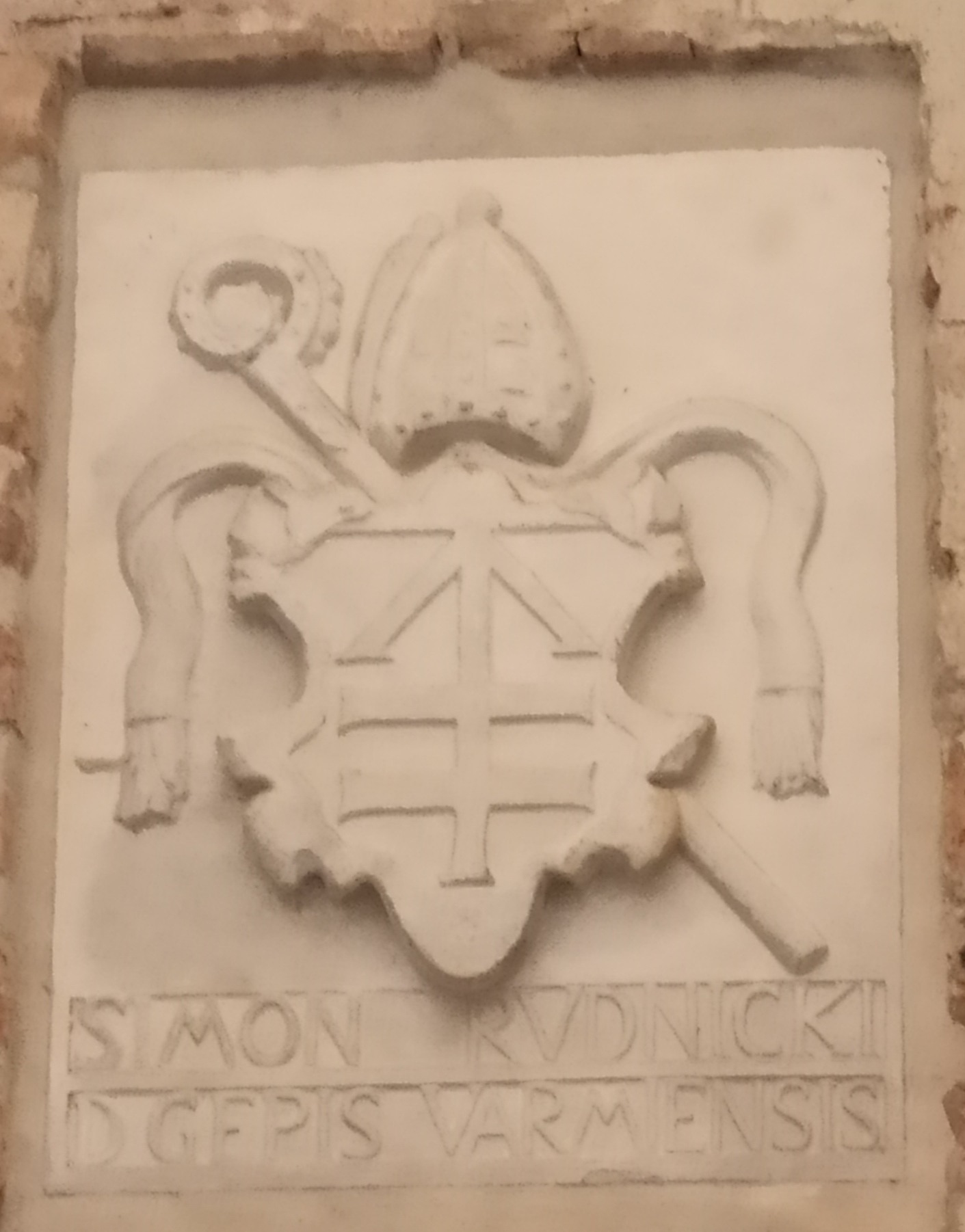
Coat of arms of Bishop Rudnicki in the Chapel of St. Andrew in Braniewo Castle
