= Anna Catherine Constance Vasa =

Anne Catherine Constance Vasa
- Hereditary Countess Palatine of Neuburg
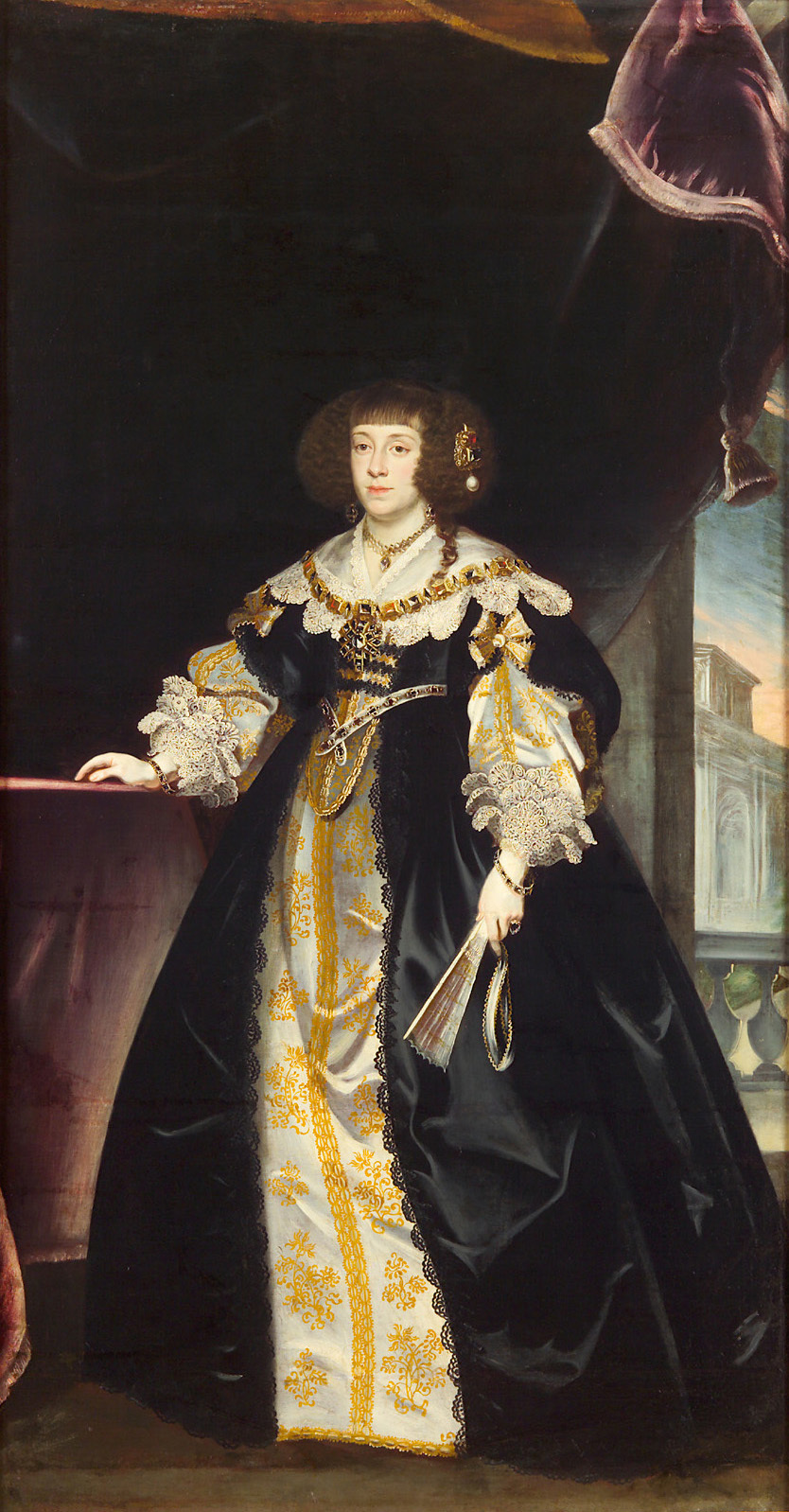
- Portrait by Frans Luycx, between 1639 and 1642.
- Born: 7 August 1619; Warsaw
- Died: 8 October 1651 (aged 32); Cologne
- Burial: Church of the Jesuits, Düsseldorf
- Spouse: Philip William, Hereditary Count Palatine of Neuburg (m. 1642)
- House: Vasa
- Father: Sigismund III Vasa
- Mother: Constance of Austria

Anna Catherine Constance Vasa (Polish: Anna Katarzyna Konstancja Waza; 7 August 1619 – 8 October 1651) was a Polish princess, daughter of King Sigismund III Vasa and his second wife, Constance of Austria.

== Life ==
After the successive deaths of her mother (1631) and father (1632), and in order to secure her upkeeping according to her rank, in 1632 the parliament bestowed her with the counties of Brodnickie, Gołubskie and Tucholskie, which previously had belonged to her mother; however, she only came into possession of them when she came of age in 1638.

Since 1637, a marriage was suggested between Anne Catherine Constance and Ferdinand Charles, Archduke of Austria, heir of Tyrol and nephew of Ferdinand II, Holy Roman Emperor. Despite arrangements in 1639 and 1642, the marriage never actually took place, because of the age of Ferdinand Charles and because of disagreement about the amount of dowry.

Frederick William, Elector of Brandenburg, and Gaston, Duke of Orléans (brother of King Louis XIII), were also candidates for her hand. However, Anne Catherine Constance finally married Philip William, heir of the Count Palatine of Neuburg and later Elector Palatine, in Warsaw on 8 June 1642. She brought a considerable dowry in jewels and cash, calculated at a total of 2 million thalers. On 18 July 1645 she gave birth her only child, a son, who died the same day.

She died childless in Cologne and was buried in the church of the Jesuits in Düsseldorf.

== Ancestors ==
Ancestors of Anna Catherine Constance Vasa

16. Erik Johansson Vasa
8. Gustav I of Sweden
17. Cecilia Månsdotter
4. John III of Sweden
18. Erik Abrahamsson Leijonhufvud
9. Margaret Leijonhufvud
19. Ebba Eriksdotter Vasa
2. Sigismund III Vasa
20. Casimir IV Jagiellon
10. Sigismund I the Old
21. Elisabeth of Austria
5. Catherine Jagiellon
22. Gian Galeazzo Sforza, Duke of Milan
11. Bona Sforza
23. Isabella of Naples
1. Anna Catherine Constance Vasa
24. Philip I of Castile
12. Ferdinand I, Holy Roman Emperor
25. Joanna of Castile
6. Charles II, Archduke of Austria
26. Vladislaus II of Hungary and Bohemia
13. Anna of Bohemia and Hungary
27. Anne of Foix-Candale
3. Constance of Austria
28. William IV, Duke of Bavaria
14. Albert V, Duke of Bavaria
29. Margravine Marie of Baden-Sponheim
7. Duchess Maria Anna of Bavaria
30. Ferdinand I, Holy Roman Emperor =12
15. Archduchess Anna of Austria
31. Anna of Bohemia and Hungary =13

== Gallery ==
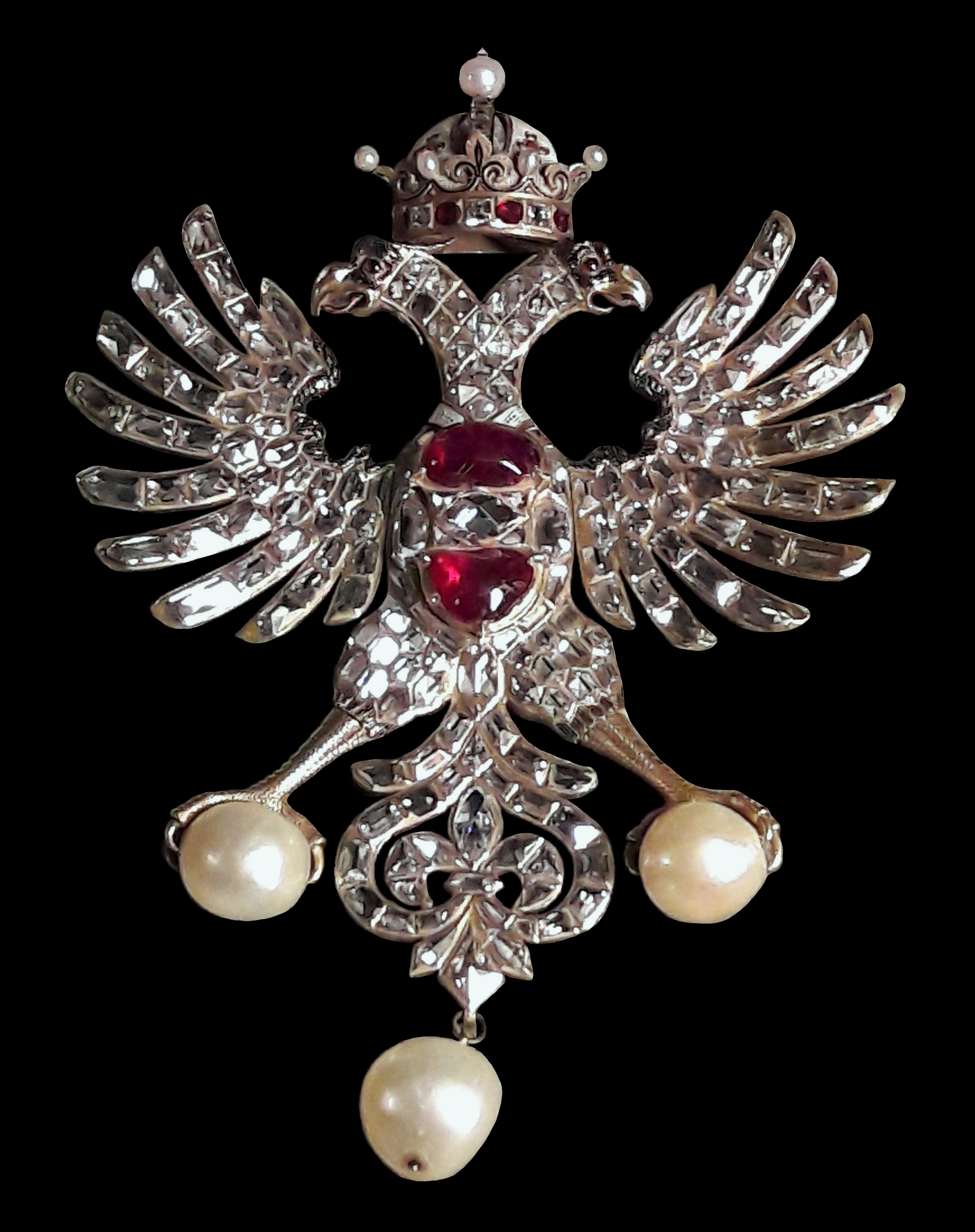
Diamond double-headed eagle of the House of Austria, most probably from dowry of Anna Catherine Constance Vasa

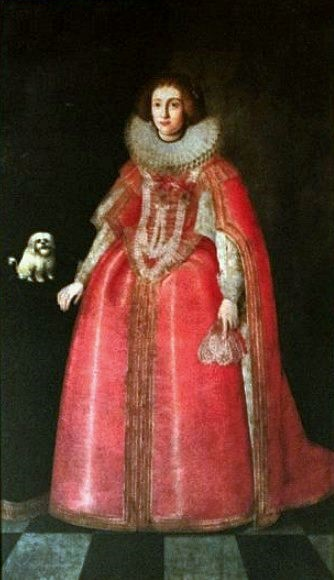
Portrait of Anne Catherine Constance Vasa with a dog, ca. 1638

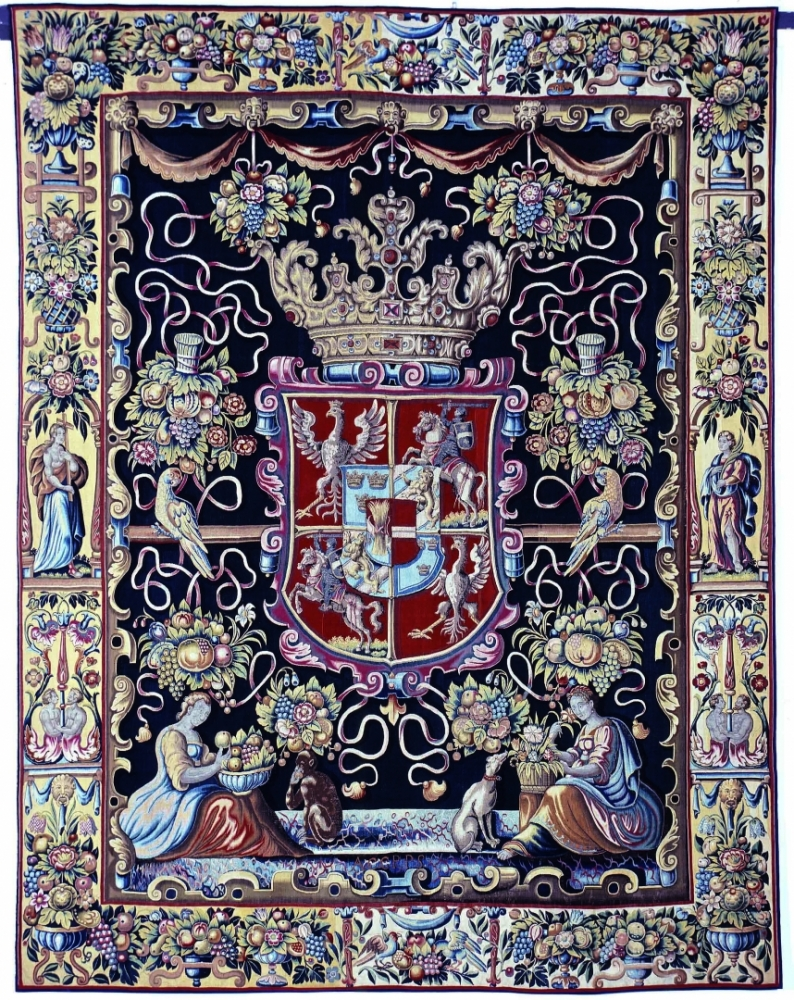
Tapestry with the coat of arms of Anna Catherine Constance Vasa, before 1642
