= Rzeczyca, Poddębice County =

Rzeczyca
- Village
- Location within Poland
- Coordinates: 51°44′20″N 18°50′32″E
- Country: Poland
- Voivodeship: Łódź
- County: Poddębice
- Gmina: Zadzim

Rzeczyca [ʐɛˈt͡ʂɨt͡sa] is a village in the administrative district of Gmina Zadzim, within Poddębice County, Łódź Voivodeship, in central Poland.
