= Alexander Charles Vasa =

Fifth son of King Sigismund III Vasa and his wife Constance of Austria

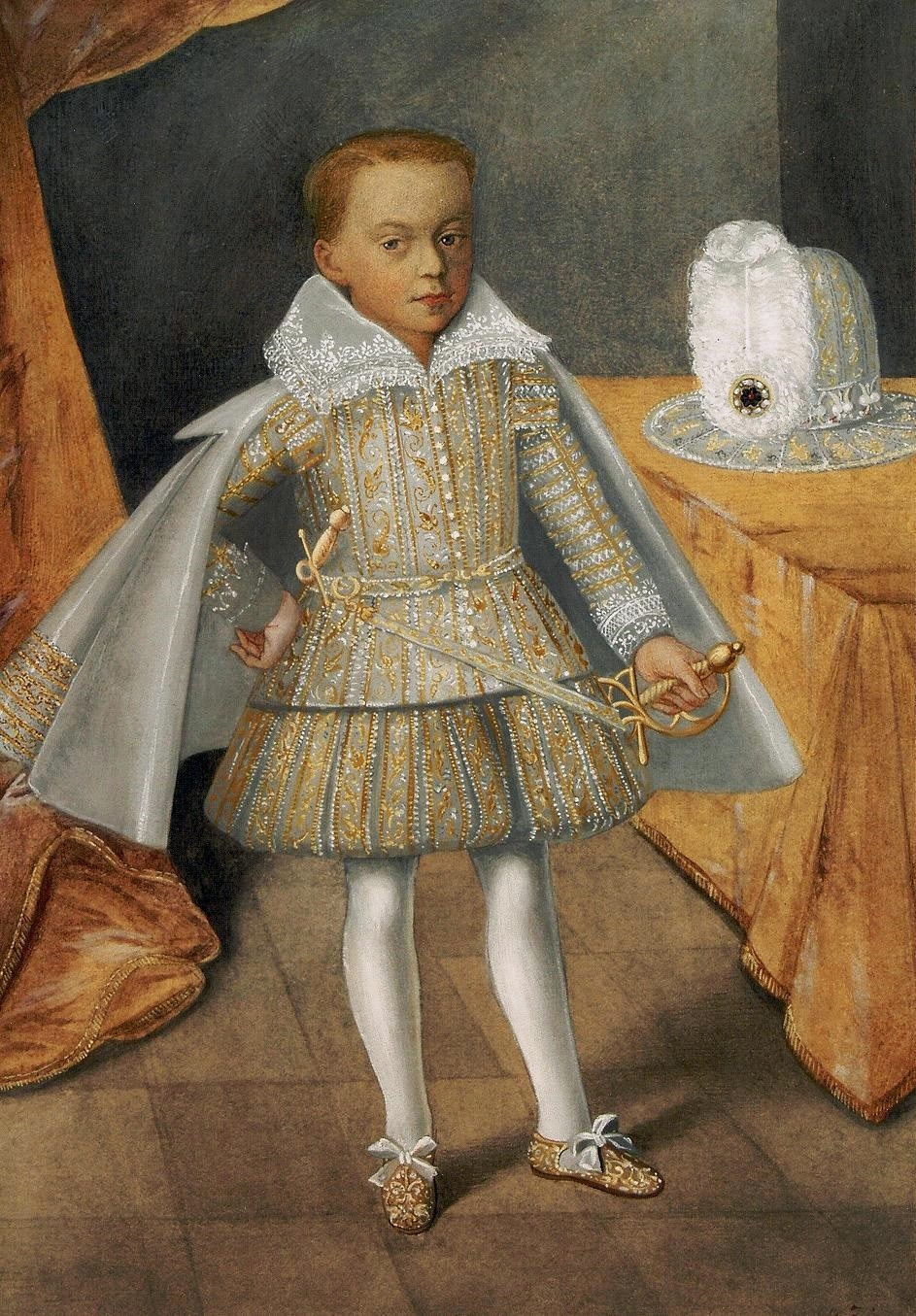
- Born: 4 November 1614
- Died: 19 November 1634 (aged 20); Lwów or Wielkie
- House: Vasa
- Father: Sigismund III Vasa
- Mother: Constance of Austria

Alexander Charles Vasa (Polish: Aleksander Karol Waza; 4 November 1614 – 19 November 1634) was a Prince of Poland, the fifth son of King Sigismund III of Poland and his wife Constance of Austria.

During the election of 1632 he supported his brother Vladislaus IV Vasa who became King of Poland. After his voyage to Italy and Germany in 1634, Alexander supported the movement for war with Ottoman Empire but died before he had any significant influence on the events. He died from smallpox in Lwów or in the village of Wielkie near Warsaw on 19 November 1634.
