= Lidzbark Castle =

- Zamek Biskupów Warmińskich (Polish)
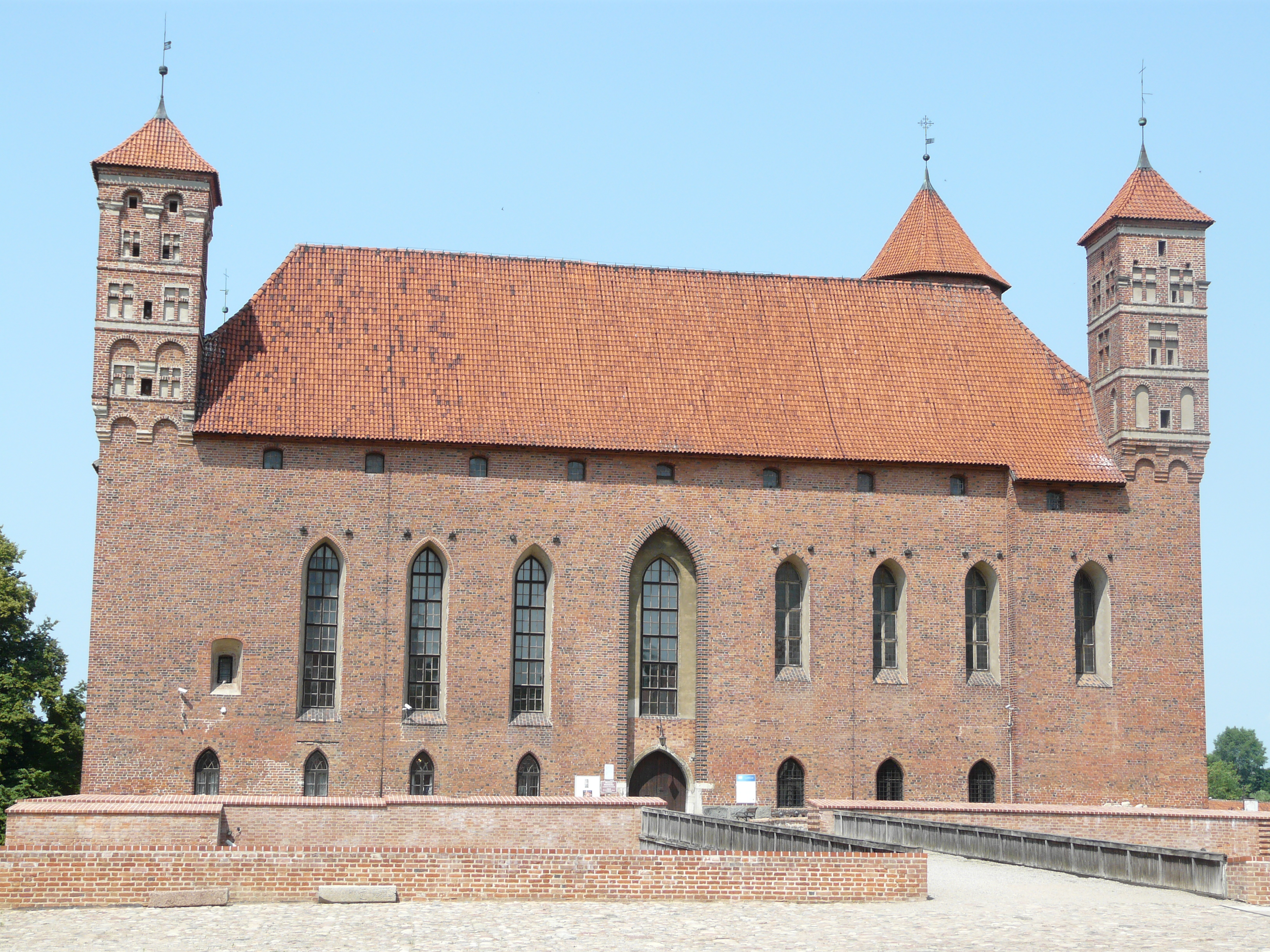
- Castle of Warmian Bishops

- Location of the Castle of Warmian Bishops in Lidzbark Warmiński in Poland Lidzbark Castle (Warmian-Masurian Voivodeship)
- 54°07′32″N 20°34′58″E
- Location: Lidzbark Warmiński, Warmian-Masurian Voivodeship, in Poland

History
- Built: 1350–1401

Site notes
- Architectural style: Brick Gothic

Historic Monument of Poland
- Designated: 2018-04-20
- Reference no.: Dz. U. z 2018 poz. 944

The Lidzbark Castle (Polish: Zamek w Lidzbarku, German: Burg Heilsberg), officially known as Lidzbark Bishops' Castle, is a fortified castle and palace from the 14th century located in the town of Lidzbark Warmiński, Warmian-Masurian Voivodeship, in northern Poland. It is one of the most precious Gothic structures in the country and a popular destination for holidaymakers. (Note: See Gothic architecture in modern Poland)

== Description ==
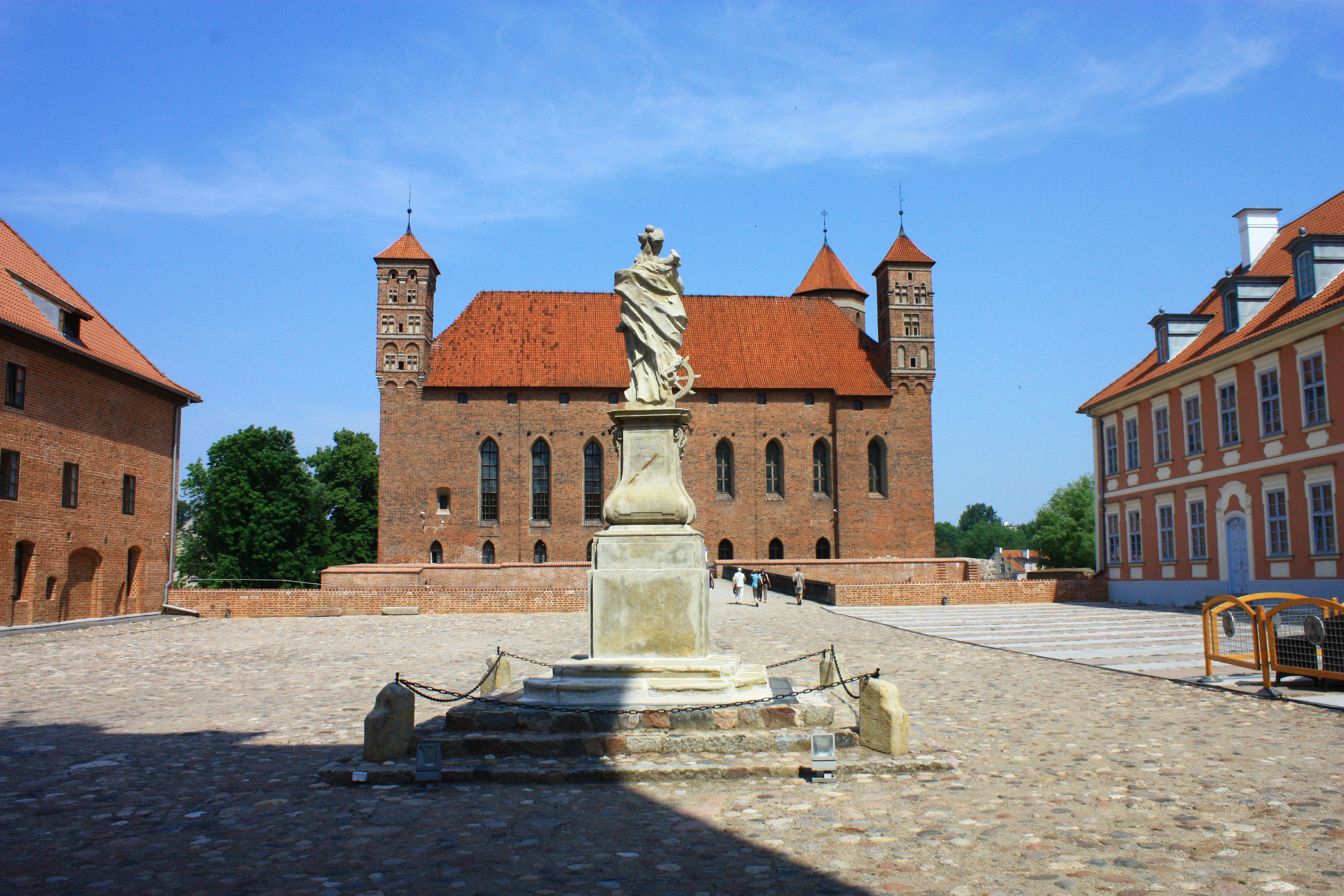
Courtyard

The palatial stronghold in Lidzbark Warmiński, which for centuries was the largest town in Warmia, is located by the estuary of the river Symsarna with the river Łyna. The stronghold is encircled by a defensive moat. An additional "dry moat" encircled the local living quarters located close to the stronghold – all of the defensive structures survive except the northern-moat, where the castle's windmill was once located.

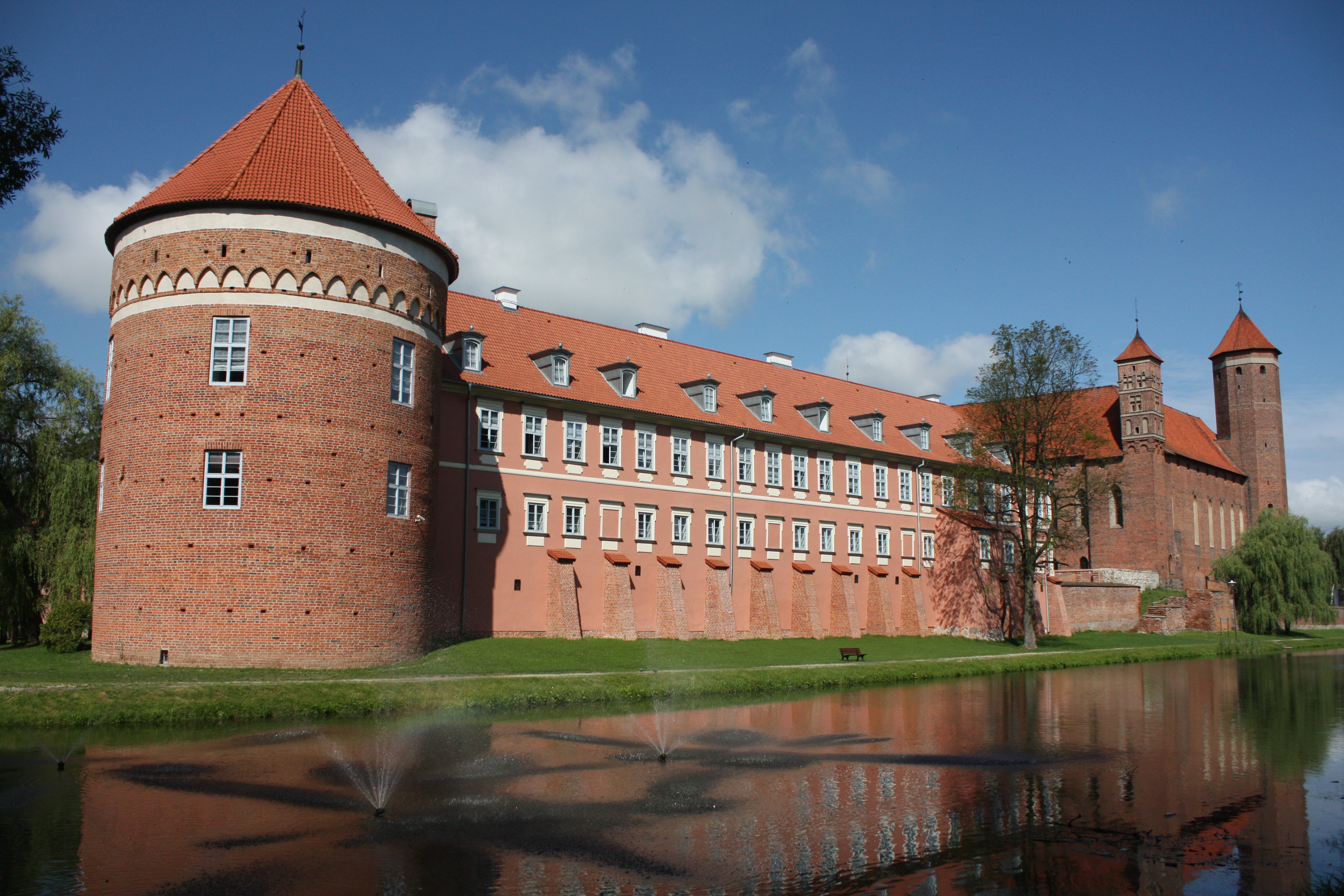
The adjacent Grabowski Palace with the castle in the background on the right

The castle was built on a plan of a square formation, with 48,5 metre long walls. A fourteen level tower is located in the north-east wing of the castle. The lower part of the tower, built in a square structure has posterns – while the upper part of the tower is octagonal. The other four corners of the castle have small square decorational towers, whose design changed throughout the centuries.

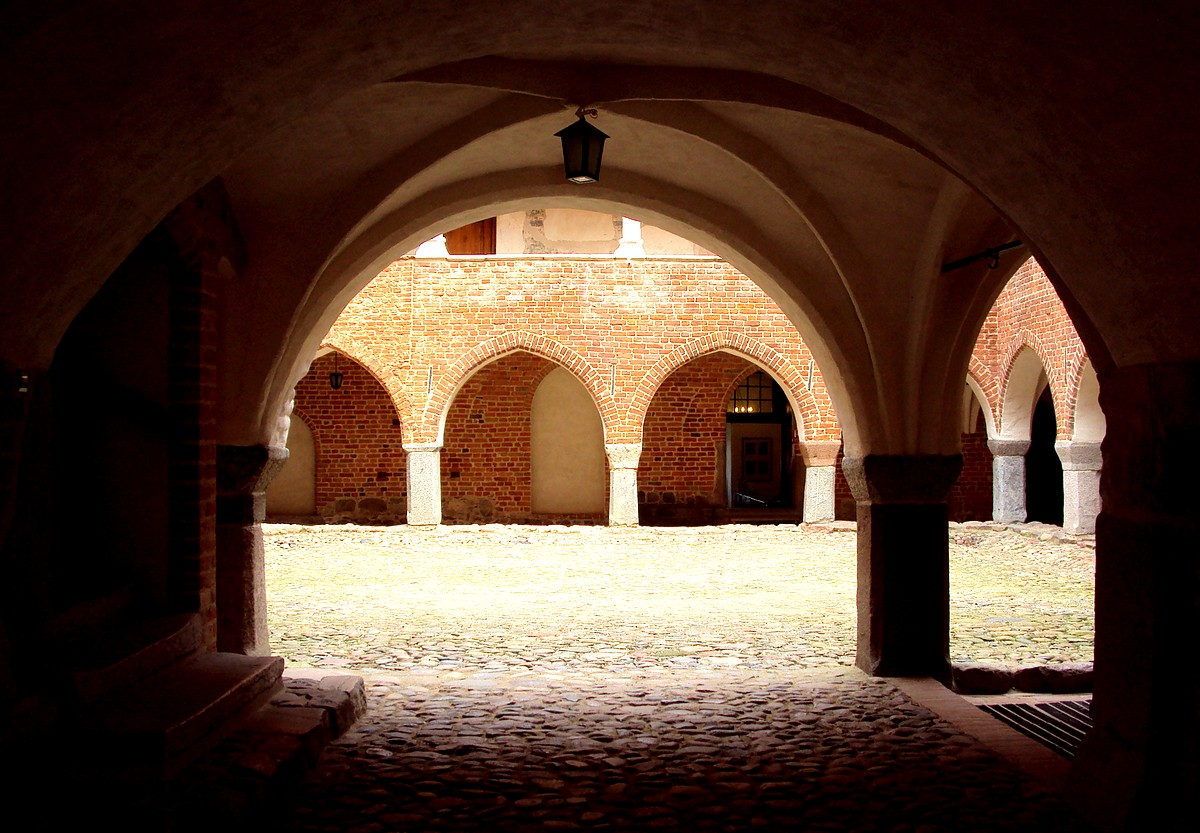
The cloister

The castle courtyard is made up of two levels – both with cloisters; these are the only historical cloisters in Poland which have not architecturally changed. The stronghold has aspects relating to the Teutonic Order, whose architectural style can be both seen in the castle's courtyard but also traced in the representative level of the castle in: the chapel; the small and big refectory; in the capitulary; common hall; and in the bishops' chambers. The castle serves as one of the main attractions of the town and regularly hosts cabaret events in the Autumn months.

== History ==
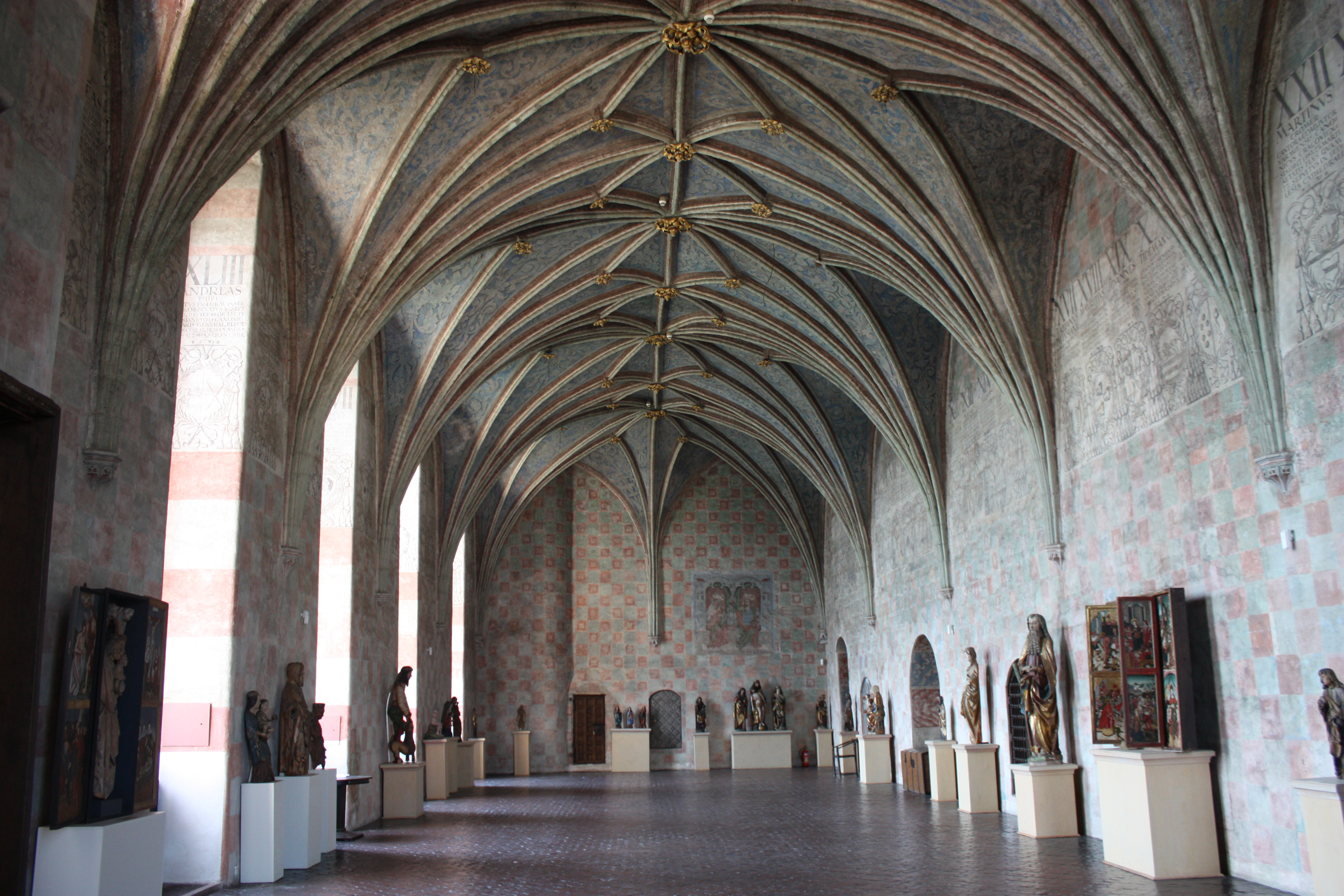
Great Refectory (refektarz)

The castle was built between 1350 and 1401 as the seat of the Warmian bishops, later going into the hands of the Teutonic Order. The Teutonic Knights lost the castle in 1466, after the Second Peace of Toruń – the fortress was part of the Polish–Lithuanian Commonwealth up until 1795 (after the Third Partition of Poland; where behind the castle walls artistic life thrived. In 1794, Ignacy Krasicki, the last residing bishop, left the castle. His successors – bishops Karol and Józef Hohenzollern – moved to Oliwa. In 1963, the castle became the premises of the Branch of the Museum of Warmia and Masuria in Olsztyn.

== See also ==
- Castles in Poland
