= Lidzbark Warmiński railway station =

Former railway station in Lidzbark Warmiński, Poland

Coordinates: 54.1308°N 20.5754°E

Lidzbark Warmiński
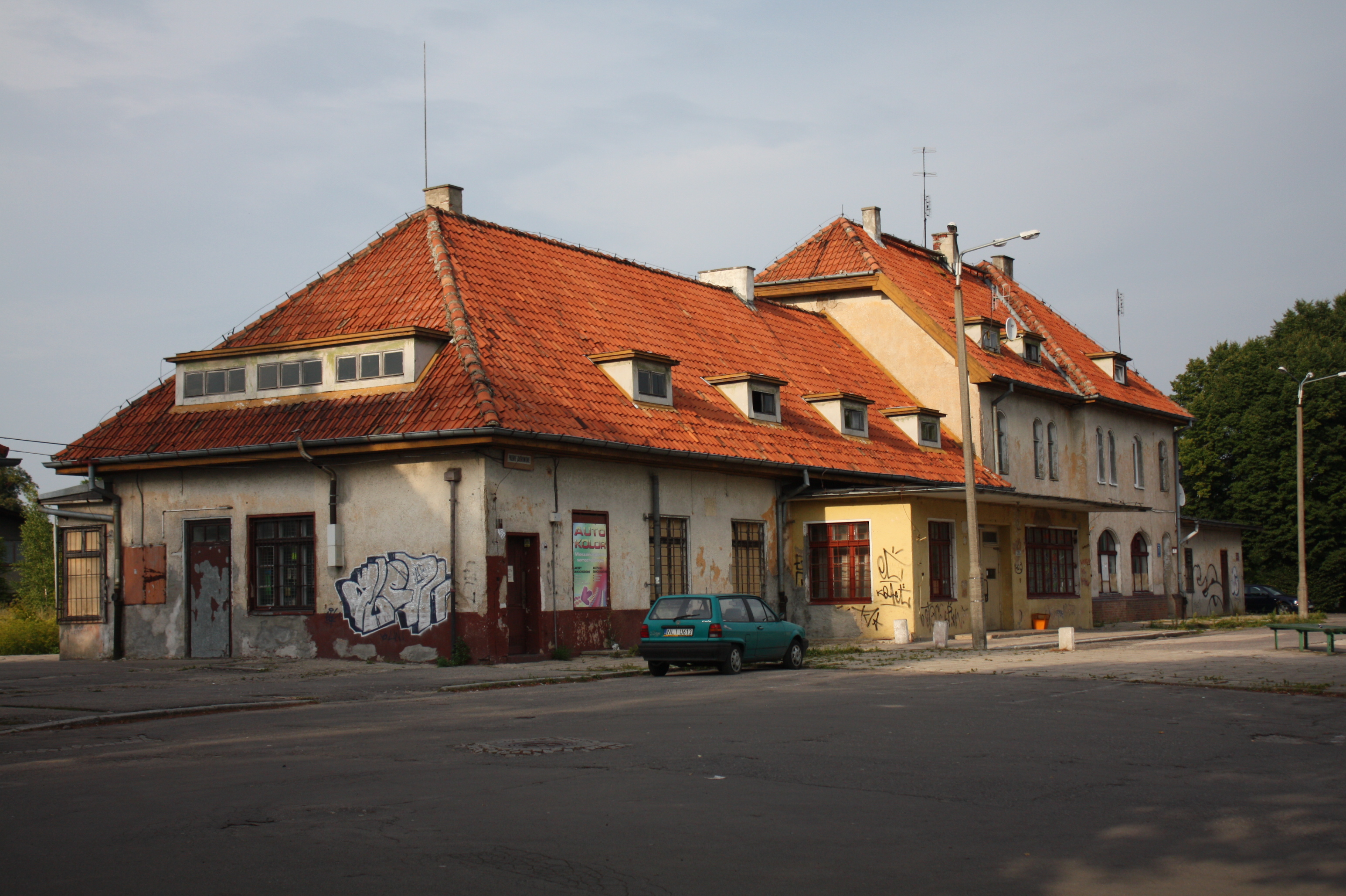
- Station building in 2012 before its renovations

General information
- Location: Lidzbark Warmiński, Warmian–Masurian Voivodeship; Poland
- Platforms: 5 (2 island platforms)

History
- Opened: 1 October 1899
- Closed: 2005
- Former names: Heilsberg 1899–1945; Lecbark 1945–1946
Location

Lidzbark Warmiński is a former railway station in Lidzbark Warmiński, Warmian–Masurian Voivodeship, Poland. The railway was officially closed in 2005. The station is now a local museum, and a waiting room for the bus terminal.

== History ==
The station was opened on 1 October 1899, with its first passenger railway connection to Górowo Iławeckie. In the same year, on 15 November, the line to Czerwonka opened. These railway connections urbanised Lidzbark Warmiński, with numerous new homes and factories being built around the station, bringing jobs to the local area. On 1 September 1905, a new railway line opened from Orneta, via Lidzbark Warmiński to Sątopy-Samulewo. This made the station a junction. In 1916, a connection to Bartoszyce was opened.

The last passenger train departed the station on 1 June 1996. The station was officially closed in 2005, with all tracks being dismantled in 2012.

In 2022, the abandoned station building was completely restored with a new waiting room (for the bus terminal), a local museum, and a tourist gift shop. The restoration costed 4.2 million PLN.

== Restoration ==
In June 2025, the mayor of Lidzbark Warmiński, Jacek Wiśniowski, proposed the restoration of the railway in Lidzbark Warmiński. A petition to the Ministry of Infrastructure and the Warmian–Masurian Voivodeship to bring back rail connections to Lidzbark Warmiński was brought to public consultations, and received 741 signatures, 131 of whom added comments and opinions.

The restoration of the station and section was estimated to cost 1 billion PLN. Lidzbark Warmiński mayor was pushing for a rail connection to the existing station in Dobre Miasto, Bartoszyce, and ultimately to Olszytn.

On 17 June 2026 it was confirmed that the plans for the full reconstruction and reopening of the station and local railway would go ahead.
