= Slavic Village Passentin =

Museum in Germany

Coordinates: 53°32′36″N 13°07′14″E

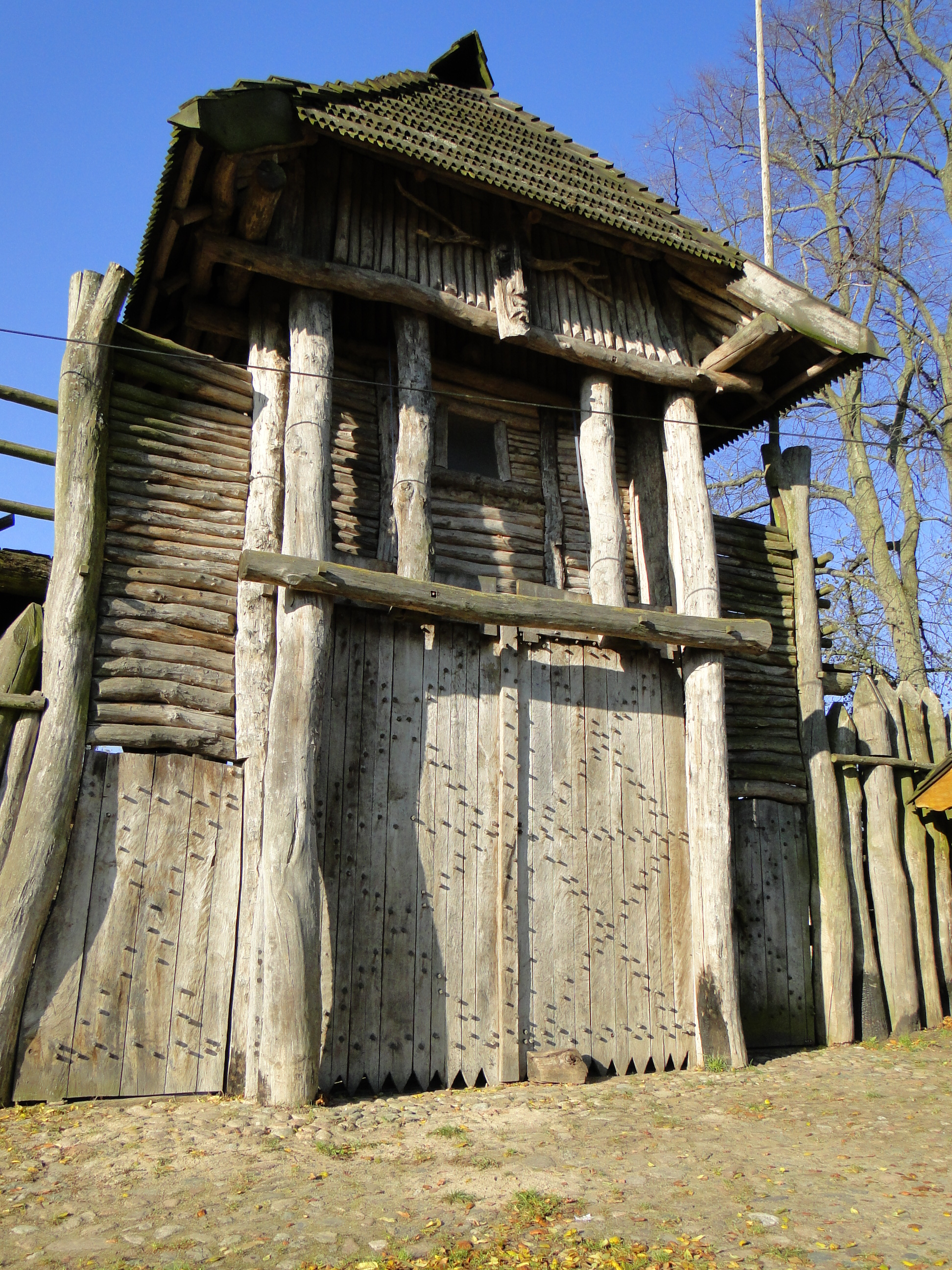
Gatehouse

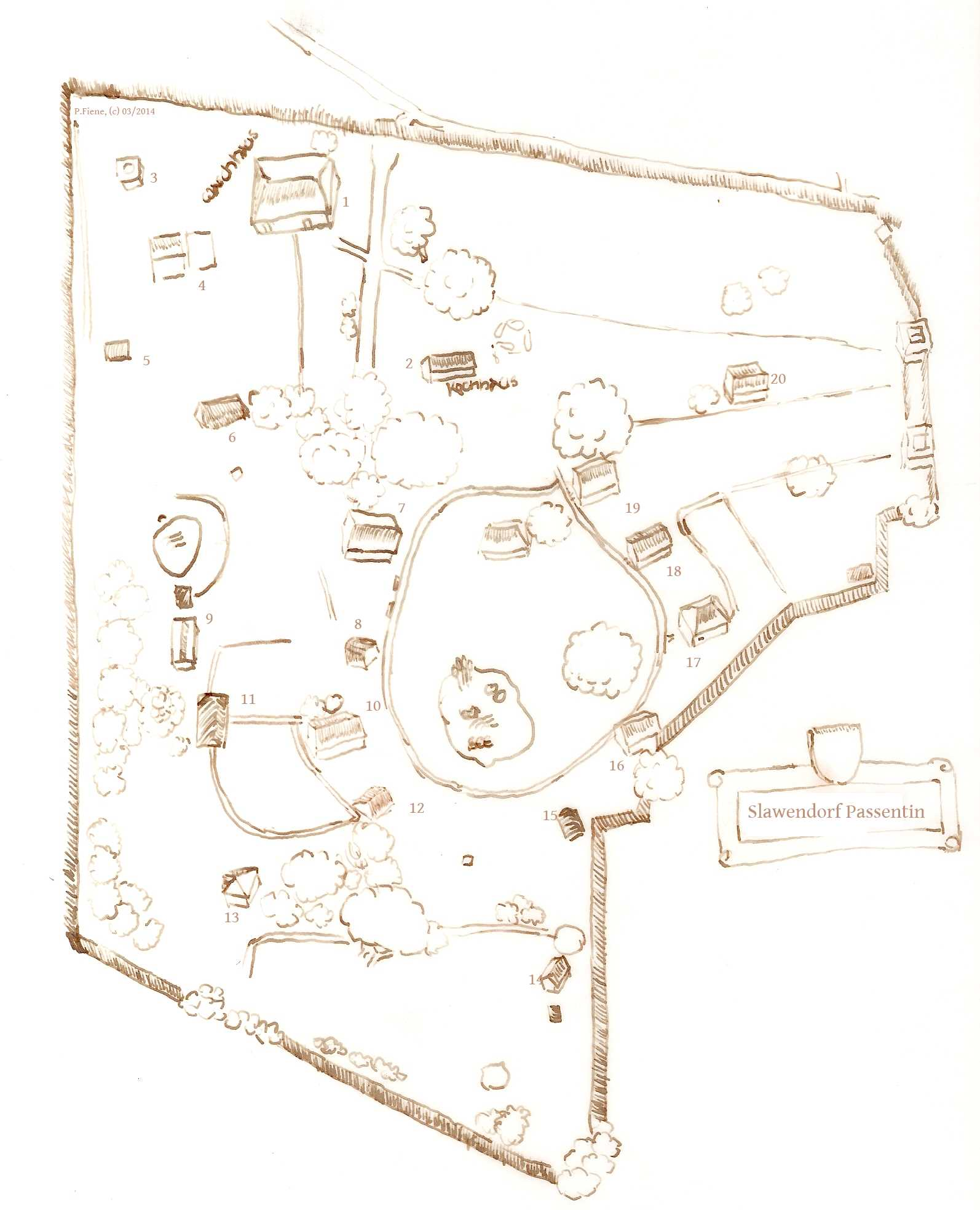
Map

Slavic Village Passentin (German: Slawendorf Passentin) is an archaeological open-air museum located in the destination of Passentin in the land of Mecklenburg-Vorpommern in Germany. The museum is a research and educational establishment specializing in cultural and rural history. The main purpose of the work is dissemination of cultural and historical knowledge, to encourages the visitors to explore their roots, their own ethnic and cultural heritage. For a few hours or some days here school classes and families able to live and acted as the Slavs in the Early Middle Ages: sleep, prepare food and even weaving, spinning, pottery, carving, forging.

== History ==
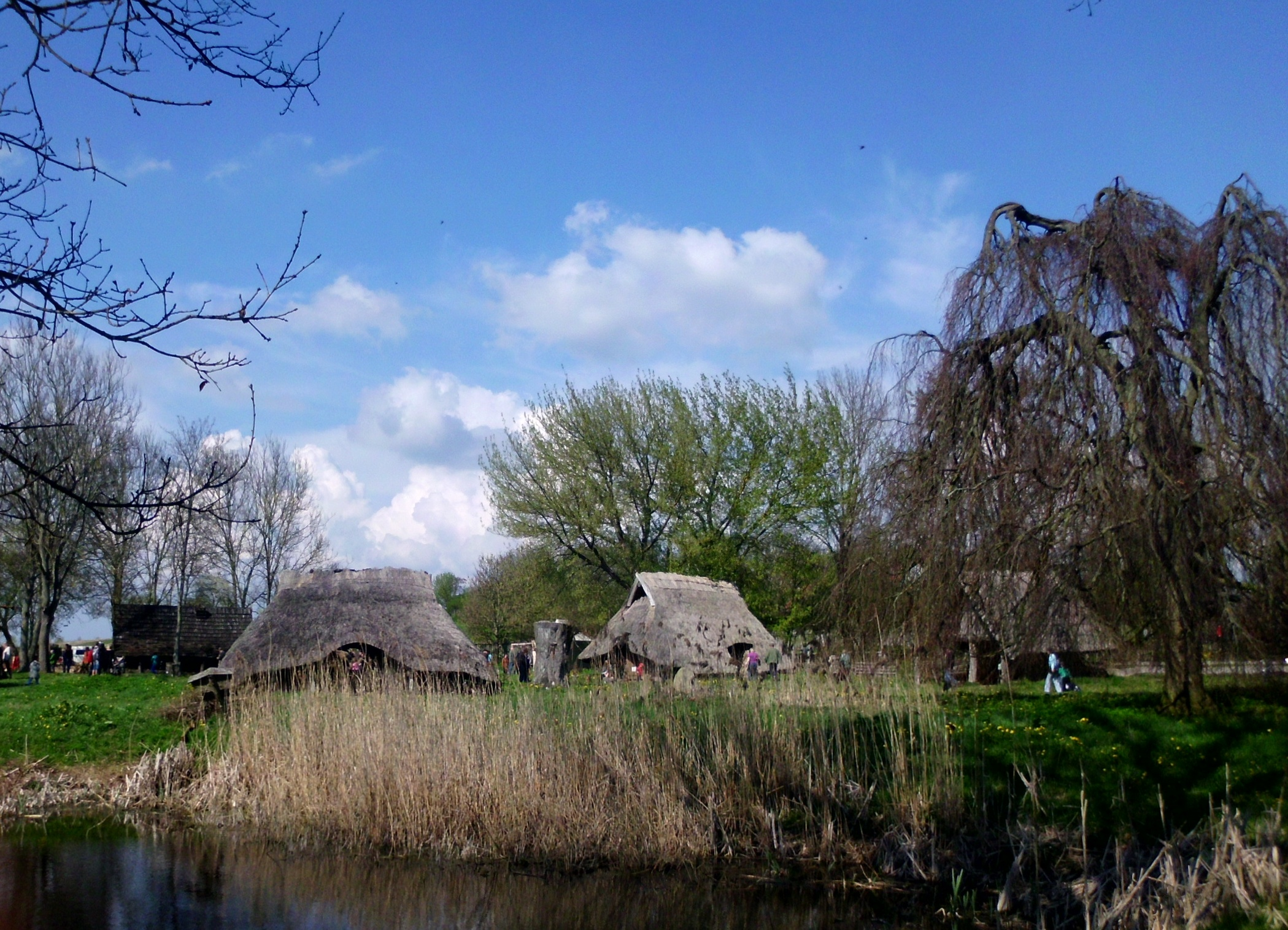
The Pond, 2014

The Slavic Village PassentinJ, built 1994–1999 thanks to the engagement of Dorothee Rätsch, a local sculptor. In the near, in the area around the Tollensesee lake, probably the location Rethra, the religious center of the West Slavs, and near Passentin during excavations has been found remnants of a Slavic Lowland castle. Therefore, was chosen the place for the Slavic Village here.

== Buildings ==
This Rundling consisting of reconstructions of windowless post in ground huts ore houses based on archaeological sources from the Early Middle Ages. Several smaller and larger single-room houses are situated around a pond. The gatehouse is the only access through the picket fence that surrounds the village. A long house (8th-10th century) serves as a venue for 20-40 people. Construction: Wattle and daub, thatched roof

=== Workshops ===
- Cooking house with dome oven, Construction: Half-timbered, Wooden shingle roofs
- Baking house with Masonry oven
- Forge with two anvils and two flues
- Pottery House- drying room for pottery Construction: Pit-house, Sod roof
- Spinning and weaving house- serves to wool processing, Construction: Log house
- Bathhouse, Construction: Log house
- Hay hut, Construction: wattle walls (willow), thatched roof
- fairytale hut, Construction: Wattle and daub, thatched roof
- joinery

=== Living huts ===
- Beekeeper hut
- Herb Cottage
- Shepherd's hut
- Hunter's hut
- Fisherman's hut
- Broomsquire's hut
- Medicine hut

=== Specialized buildings ===
- Sanitary building, the only modern building
- Log house, currently used as an office
- Animal stalls- currently unused

== See also ==
- List of open-air museums in Germany
