= Andrzej Rozbicki =

Polish-Canadian conductor and music educator

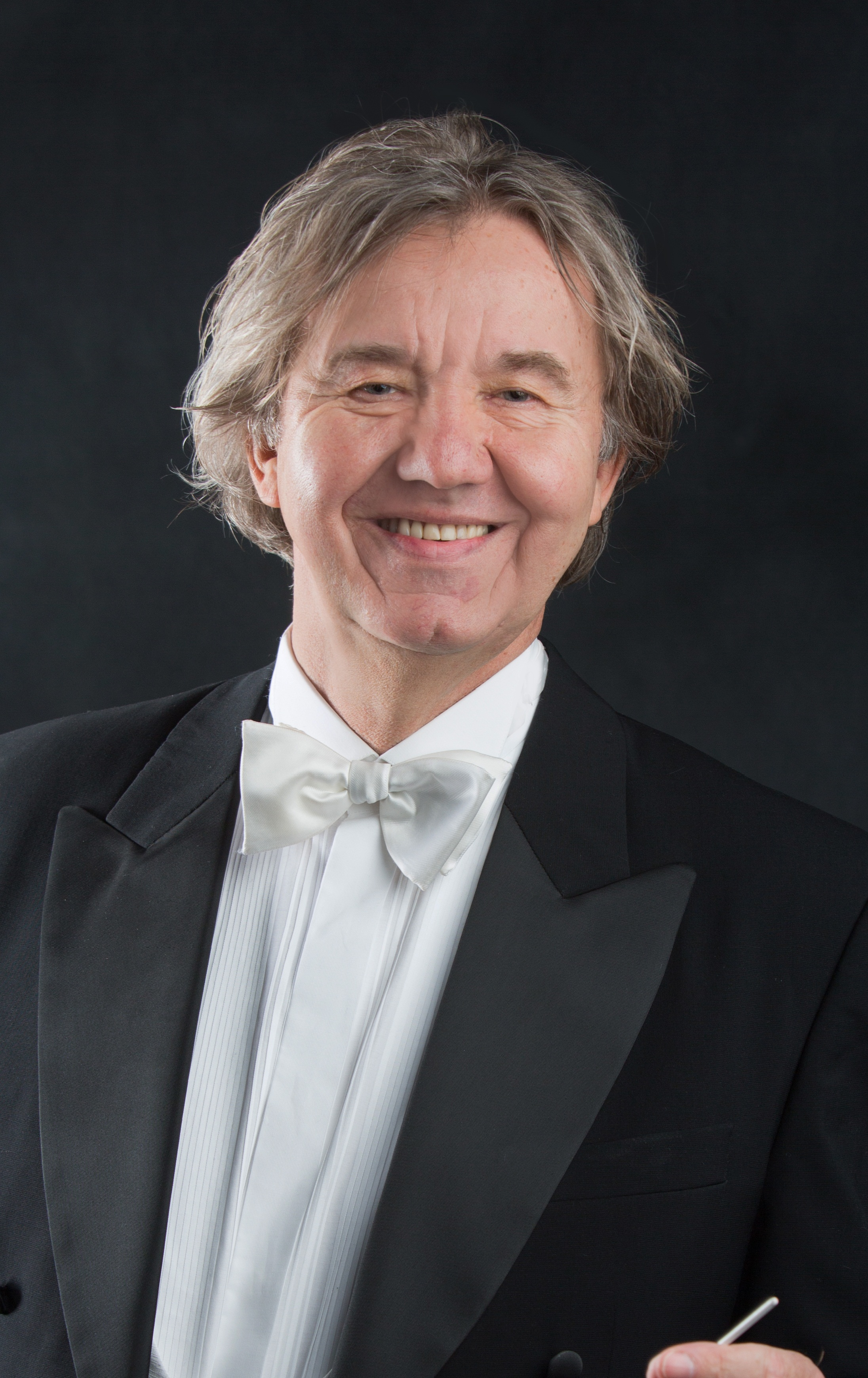
- Born: October 20, 1948 (age 77); Lidzbark Warminski, Poland
- Education: Master of Music Education; Master of Instrumental Music; Doctor of Musical Arts
- Years active: 1977 - Present
- Website: rozbicki.com

Andrzej Rozbicki (Polish pronunciation: [ˈand͡ʐɛj rɔzˈbit͡skʲi]; born October 20, 1948, in Lidzbark Warmiński, Poland), also known as Andrew Rozbicki, is a Polish-Canadian conductor, music educator, producer and promoter of Polish music in Canada and United States. He is the founder and artistic director of Celebrity Symphony Orchestra. He is a Music Educator with Toronto Catholic District School Board.

Rozbicki was a guest conductor of the New York Festival Symphony Orchestra, and has conducted the Chicago Paderewski Symphony Orchestra. He has also worked with several choirs in Canada, including Harfa, Symfonia and Polonia Singers.

== Early life and education ==
Rozbicki was born and raised in Lidzbark Warminski, Poland. He graduated from the Warsaw Frederic Chopin Academy of Music with master's degree in music education in 1976 and a master's degree in instrumental music in 1977. Subsequently, he went to the Maastricht Conservatory in the Netherlands where he studied with symphony orchestra conducting Sef Pijpers and later studied at the Michigan State University. In 2007 he received Doctor of Musical Arts degree from Kraków Music Academy, Poland.

== Career ==
In 1977, Rozbicki was appointed as the conductor of two orchestras, Z.M. Ursus in Warsaw and the Glassworks in Wolomin. Later he started conducting the Polish Brass Orchestra, which received second and third prize at the World Music Competition in 1981 Kerkrade, Netherlands under Robizcki's direction. In 1983, Rozbicki received the second prize at the Janitsjarfestivalen Competition in Hamar, Norway.

Rozbicki was the bassoon player and conductor of Bremen Symphony Orchestra and Music Director Westerstede Stadtorchester in Germany from 1983 to 1985. In 1985, Rozbicki moved to Canada and began working in teaching music with TCDSB. For his work in introducing Polish music to Canada, he received the Merit of Polish Culture medal in 1991. Rozbicki organized the Brampton Symphony Orchestra and was their conductor for five years.

In 1994, in Toronto, he founded the Celebrity Symphony Orchestra and became its artistic director and conductor. The orchestra has presented many musical spectacles such as "Ludzmierz Vespers", "The Polish Tenors", "Golden Voices", "Kilar the Best", "Kiepura Gala", "Polish Rhapsody", "Polish Heart", "Viva Carnival", "Paderewski Celebration", "Wola Nas Pan", and "Chopin and Guests".

The Markowski Foundation in Canada recognized him in 1996 as The Man of the Year in Canada. In 1998, when Rozbicki was directing the Polonia Singers choir, it received three first place honors and Rozbicki himself was recognized as the Best Choir Director at the forty-fifth convention and competitions of Polish Singers Alliance of America in Chicago. The same year, he was named an Honorary Member and Artistic Director of the Polish Singers Alliance of America.

In 1999, Rozbicki was awarded Senate of Canada Award of Merit and in 2000 Mayor's Toronto Millennium Award. In August, he was a conductor of the final gala concert at XXIX Jan Kiepura's Festival Krynica in Poland. In March 2006 Rozbicki was awarded Knight's Order of Polonia Restitut by President Republic of Poland and Gold Honorary Award by Polish Congress in Canada. The next year, he received Doctor of Musical Arts degree from Kraków Music Academy, Poland.

In October 2011, the Polish Ministry of Culture and National Heritage awarded Rozbicki the Gloria Artis. In 2012, he created a Music and History course with the Toronto Catholic District Board of Education whereby he takes a performing group of approximately 30 students every year for three weeks to a different part of Europe. The next year, he worked on promoting Canadian music in Poland, performing two concerts under the patronage of the Canadian Ambassador to Poland.

He is a teacher at Toronto's Bishop Marrocco/Thomas Merton High School. He was guest conductor for orchestras in Poland: Lodz Music Theater Orchestra, Pomerania Philharmonic Orchestra in Bydgoszcz, Warminska Philharmonic Orchestra in Olsztyn, Sudecka Philharmonic Orchestra in Walbrzych and Dolnoslaska Philharmonic Orchestra in Jelenia Gora. As a promoter of Polish music he has conducted pieces by Witold Lutoslawski, Henryk Gorecki, Jan Kanty Pawluskiewicz, Wlodzimierz Korcz and Wojciech Kilar in Canada and United States. In 2016 he conducted Canadian works by Dolores Claman, Godfrey Ridout, Calixa Lavallee and David Tanner in Poland.

== Awards and honors ==
- 1981 - Second prize at the World Music Competition in Kerkrade, the Netherlands
- 1983 - Second prize at the Janitsjarfestivalen Competition, Norway
- 1991 - Merit of Polish Culture Medal
- 1994 - Gold Medal Merit of Polish Culture
- 1997 - Gold Cross by Polish Combatants Association in Canada
- 1996 - Man of the Year by The Markowski Foundation
- 1999 - Senate of Canada Award of Merit
- 2000 - Mayor's Toronto Millennium Award.
- 2001 - Gold Combatants Award by Polish Combatants
- 2003 - Polish Community Entertainer of the Year
- 2006 - Knight's Order of Polonia Restitut by President Republic of Poland
- 2006 - Gold Honorary Award by Polish Congress in Canada
- 2006 - OISE Award by University of Toronto (OISE)
- 2009 - Marty's Award by Mississauga Arts Council
- 2011 - Gloria Artis by Polish Ministry of Culture and National Heritage
- 2015 - Officer's Cross of Polonia Restituta by President Republic of Poland
