= Symsarna =

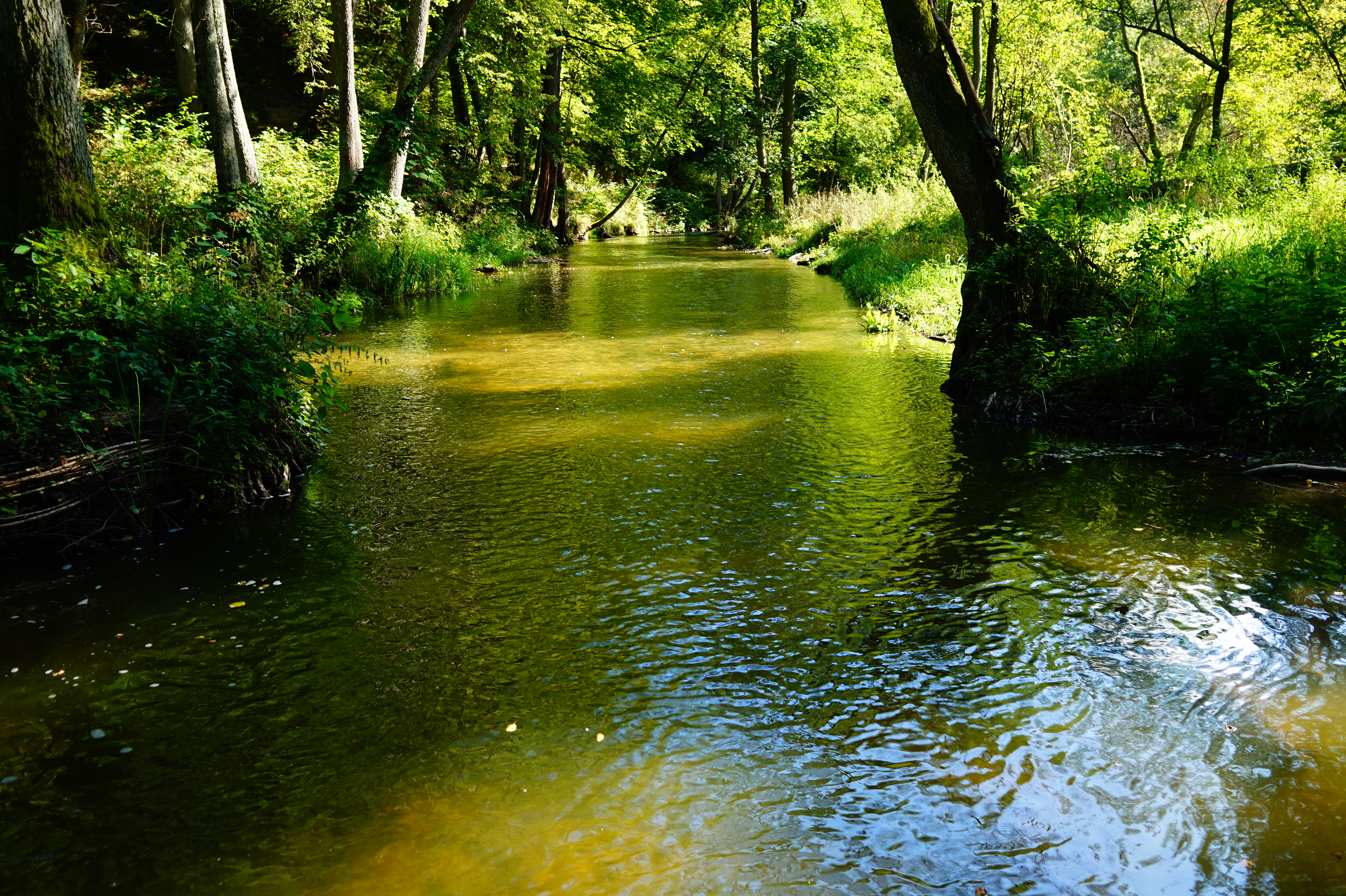

Location
- Country: Poland
- Voivodeship: Warmian–Masurian

Physical characteristics
- Source: Luterskie Lake
  - location: northeast of Żardeniki, Olsztyn County
  - coordinates: 53°58′54″N 20°49′02″E
  - elevation: 141 m (463 ft)
- Mouth: Łyna
  - location: Lidzbark Warmiński, Lidzbark County
  - coordinates: 54°07′38″N 20°34′59″E
  - elevation: 58 m (190 ft)
- Length: 38.51 km (23.93 mi)

Basin features
- Progression: Łyna→ Pregolya→ Baltic Sea

Symsarna is a river of Poland, a tributary of the Łyna River in Lidzbark Warmiński.
