= Dorothee Rätsch =

German artist

Dorothee Raetsch
- Dorothee Rätsch
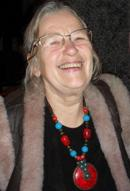
- Born: Neumann; 25 November 1940 (age 85); Heilsberg, East Prussia
- Known for: Sculpture, graphic
- Awards: Heinrich-Schliemann-medal
- Website: dorothee-raetsch.beepworld.de

Dorothee Rätsch (also spelled Raetsch; born 1940 in Heilsberg, today Lidzbark Warmiński, Poland) is a German sculptor and graphic artist, the daughter of Margarete Neumann, a writer and poet.

== Biography ==
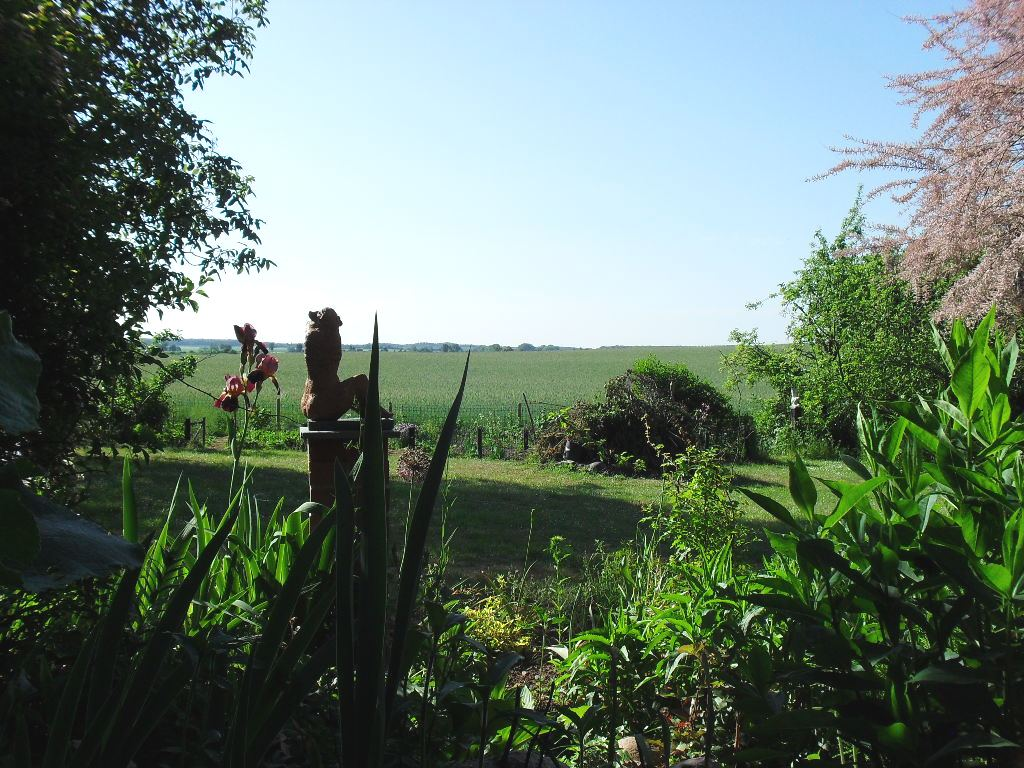
View through the sculpture garden

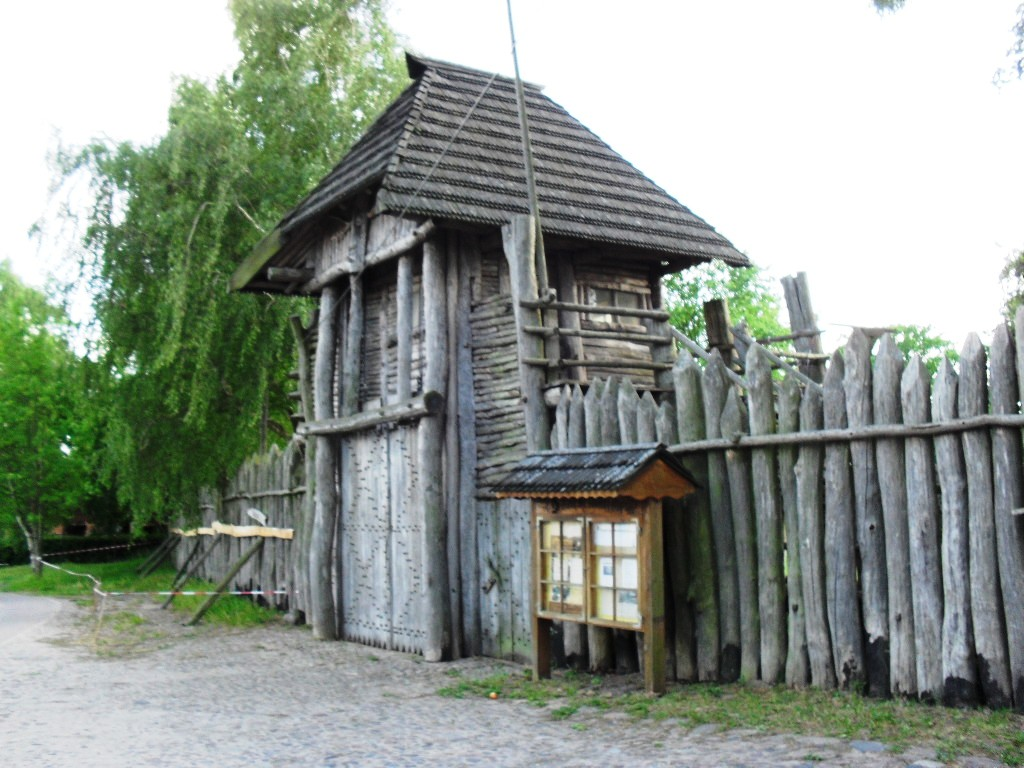
Entrance to the Slavic Village Passentin

Up to 1945 Dorothee Rätsch was living in Heilsberg, along with her mother and her sibling. Her Mother, widowed in World War II, worked as a welfare worker. In 1945 they fled from East Prussia westward to Mecklenburg.

In child and youth courses Dorothee Rätsch started early, to engage with the visual arts. Later, in addition to training and work in agriculture, she attended the evening high school and worked in courses and programs at their artistic skills.

After an entrance examination, Dorothee Rätsch was accepted and became a member of the Association of Artists of the GDR (Verband Bildender Künstler der DDR) in 1971. Since then, she participated in numerous national and international exhibitions and plein airs. Now she is only active regionally in Mecklenburg-Vorpommern, such as in the statewide campaigns KUNST OFFEN (Artists are open up their studios to visitors) and Offene Gärten (open gardens).

Dorothee Rätsch lives and works in Passentin (Mecklenburg-Vorpommern), where they built up the Slavic Village Passentin, an authentic early medieval place of learning and experience (Idea, concept planning and oversee the construction: Dorothee Rätsch). It was especially important for them to work with children and young people, as course leader.

Also she has established a sculpture garden beside her studio.

== Sculptures ==
In bronze, terracotta and wood emerge small sculptures, medals and figurative sculptures and reliefs.

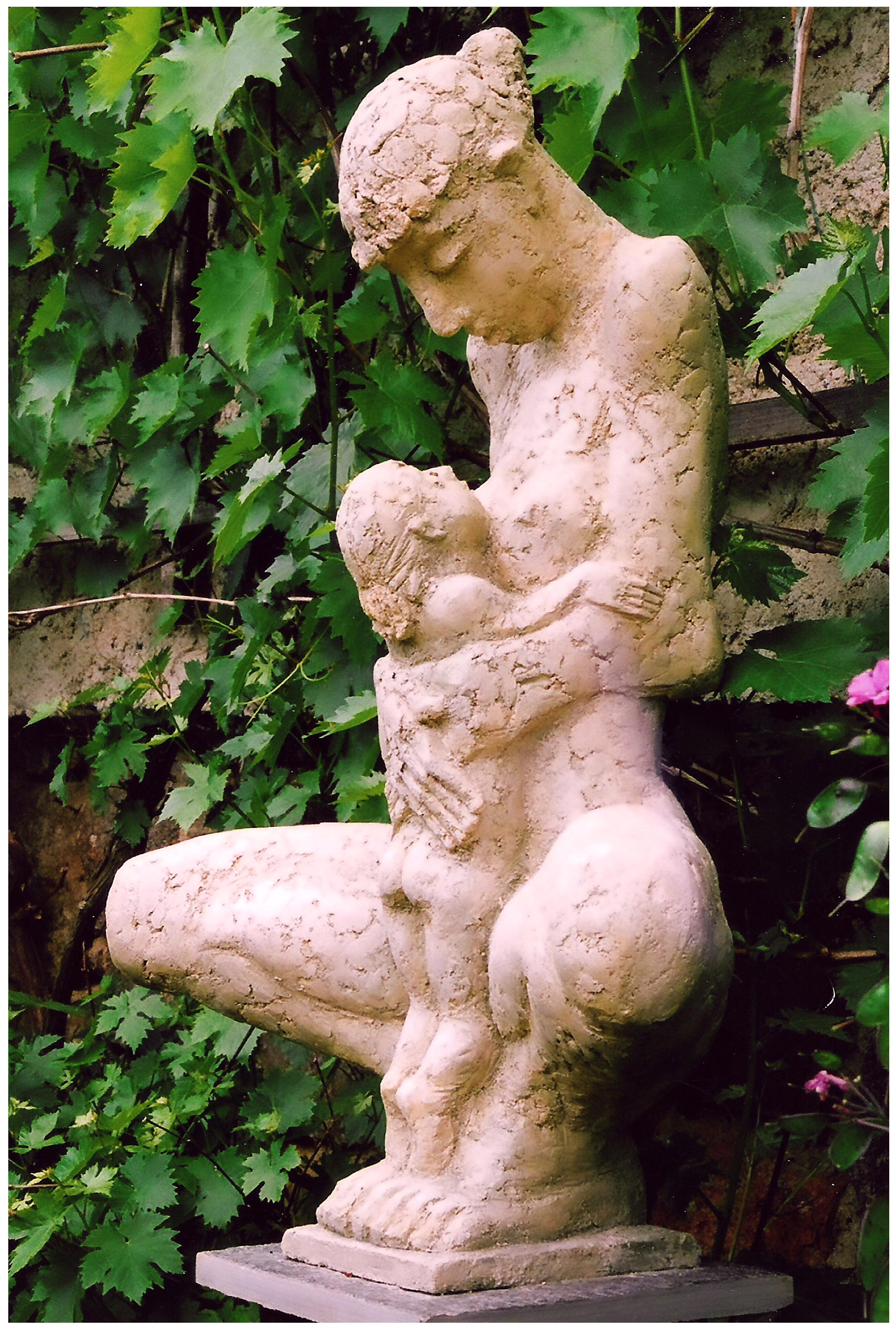
Mother and child

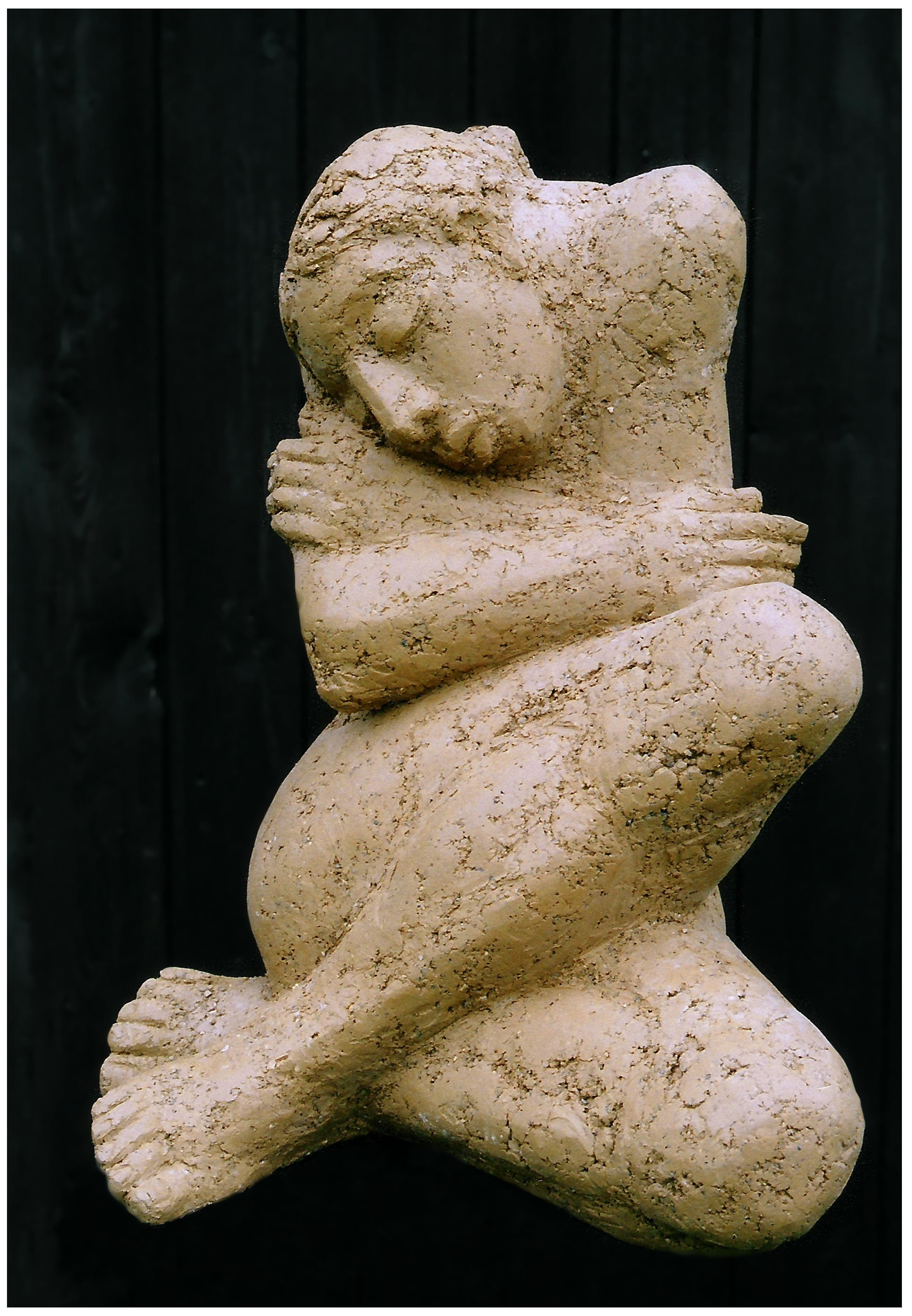
Yesterday

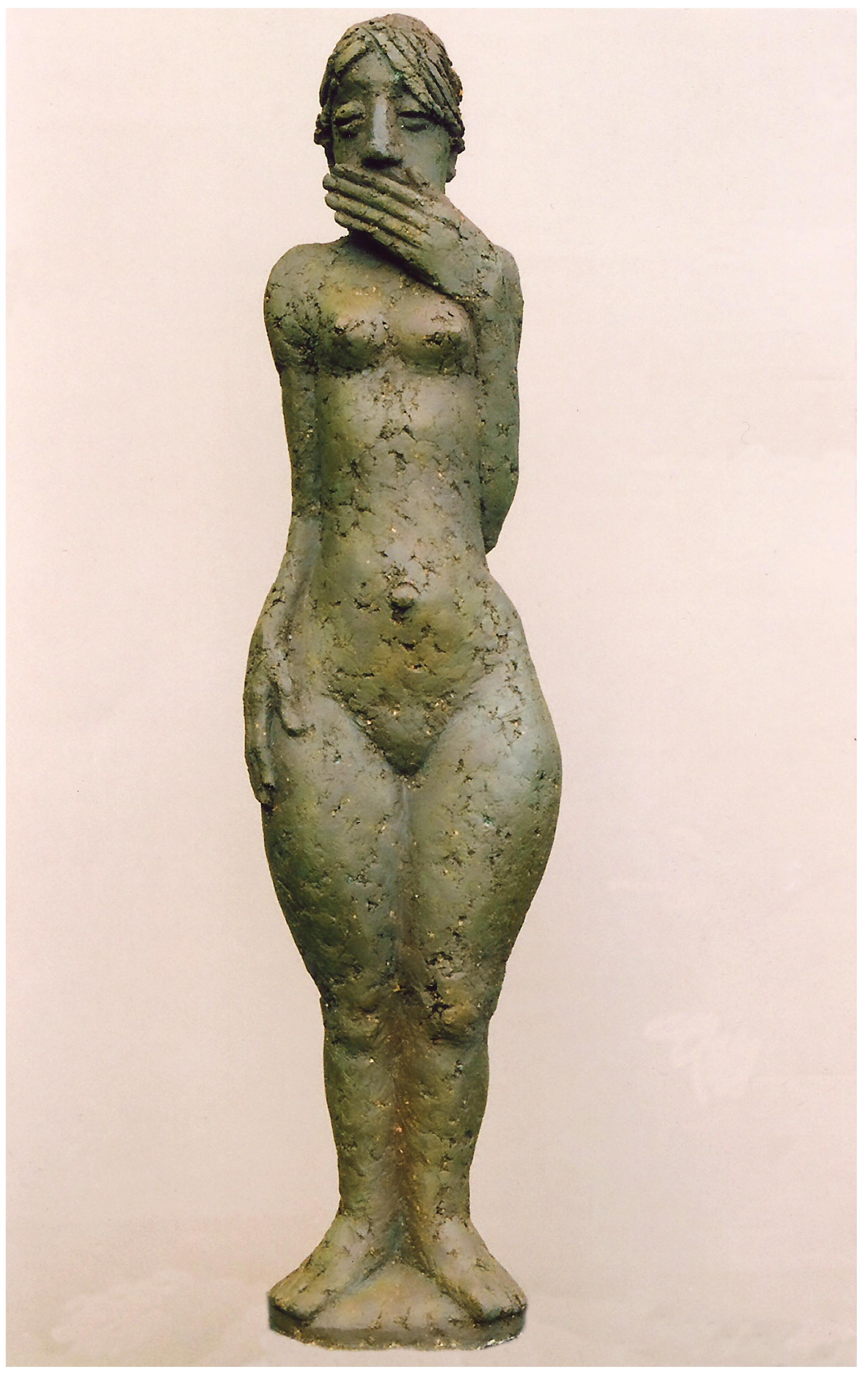
Intima

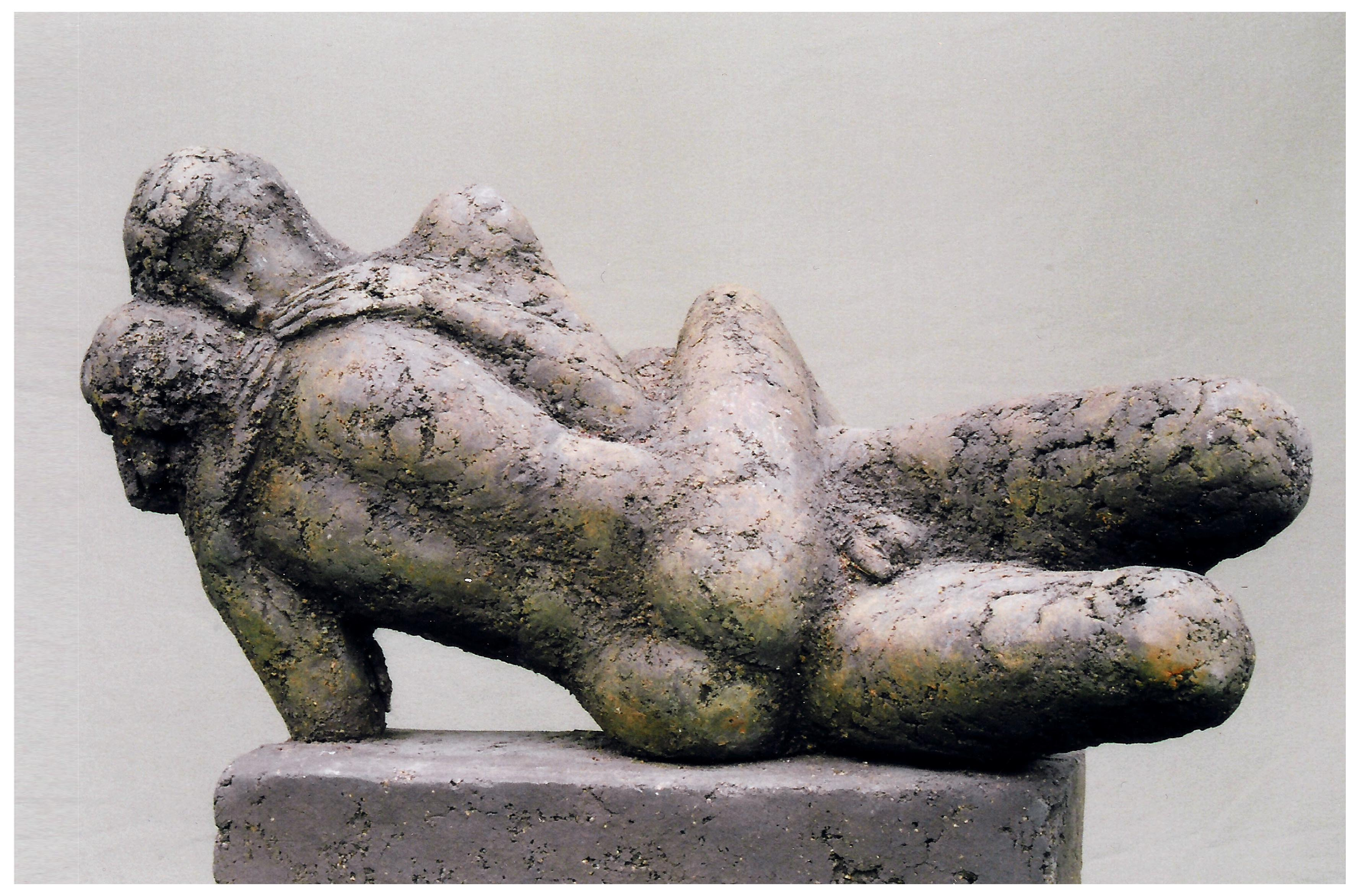
Pair of lovers

== Awards ==
Fritz-Reuter-Price
1999 Heinrich-Schliemann-medal
