= Elma (river) =

Location
- Country: Poland
- Voivodeship: Warmian–Masurian

Physical characteristics
- Source
  - location: near Sigajny, Bartoszyce County
  - coordinates: 54°21′18.0″N 20°31′34.0″E
- Mouth: Łyna
  - location: near Wojdyty, Lidzbark County
  - coordinates: 54.1662°N 20.6114°E
- Length: 37.6 km (23.4 mi)
- Basin size: 281 km^{2} (108 mi^{2})

Basin features
- Progression: Łyna→ Pregolya→ Baltic Sea

Elma is a river of Poland, a tributary of the Łyna River near Lidzbark Warmiński.
