= Lidzbark Warmiński =

Town in Warmian-Masurian Voivodeship, Poland

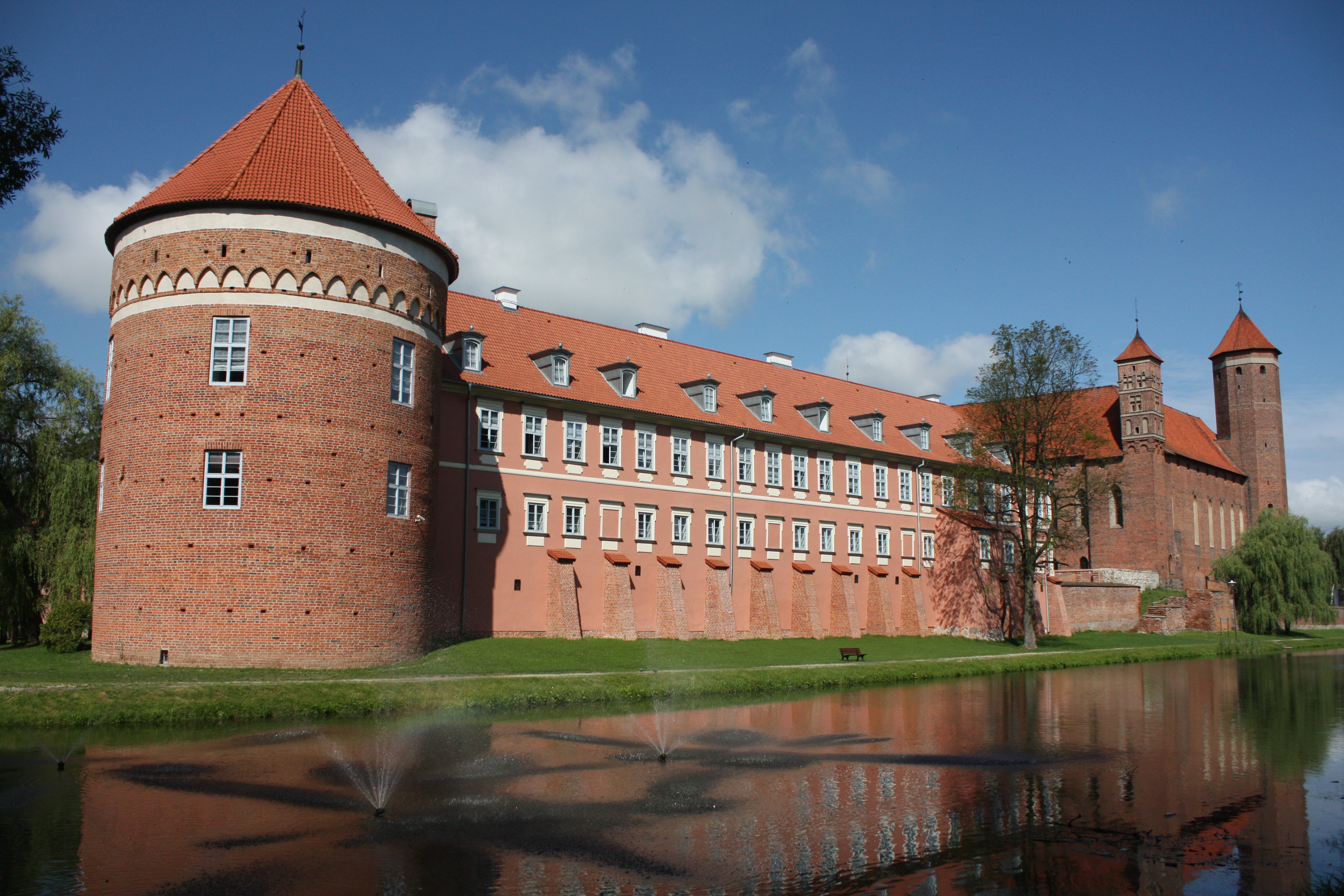
- Castle of Warmian Bishops

- Flag Coat of arms
- Interactive map of Lidzbark Warmiński
- Location within Poland
- Coordinates: 54°07′33″N 20°34′50″E
- Country: Poland
- Voivodeship: Warmian-Masurian
- County: Lidzbark
- Gmina: Lidzbark Warmiński (urban gmina)
- Established: before 1240
- Town rights: 1308

Government
  - Mayor: Jacek Wiśniowski

Area
  - Total: 14.34 km^{2} (5.54 sq mi)

Population (2006)
  - Total: 16,390
  - Density: 1,143/km^{2} (2,960/sq mi)
- Time zone: UTC+1 (CET)
  - Summer (DST): UTC+2 (CEST)
- Postal code: 11-100 to 11-102
- Area code: +48 086
- Car plates: NLI
- Website: lidzbarkw.pl

Lidzbark Warmiński ([ˈlʲid͡zbarɡ varˈmʲiɲskʲi]; German: Heilsberg, [ˈhaɪlsbɛʁk]), often shortened to Lidzbark, is a historical town located within the Warmian-Masurian Voivodeship, in northern Poland. It is the capital of Lidzbark County.

Lidzbark Warmiński was once the capital of Warmia and formerly its largest town. Lidzbark itself was a religious and cultural center, for which it was known as the Pearl of Warmia. For a long period of time it was under the control of the Warmian Bishops and it was also a major economic center, only resigning its importance to the nearby city of Braniewo.

The Warmian Bishop's Castle is considered to be a great artistic and historical value in the world and has been recognised as a Historic Monument by the Polish government.

== History ==
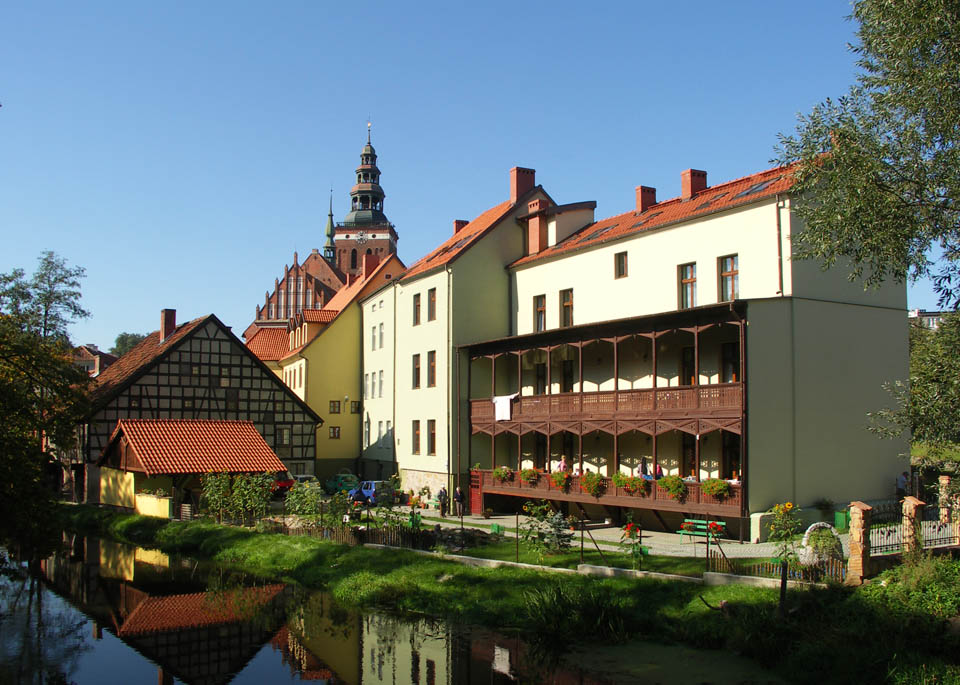
View of the Old Town on the Łyna River and Collegiate Church

The town was originally a settlement of Old Prussians known as Lecbarg until being conquered in 1240 by the Teutonic Knights, who named it Heilsberg. In 1306 it became the seat for the Bishopric of Warmia, and remained the Prince-Bishop's seat for 500 years. In 1309 the settlement received town privileges. In the 1350s the Castle of Warmian Bishops was built, and it was expanded in the following centuries, becoming one of the most significant and remarkable historic monuments of Warmia, which nowadays houses a museum and is listed as a Historic Monument of Poland. In 1440 the town joined the anti-Teutonic Prussian Confederation, upon the request of which in 1454 Polish King Casimir IV Jagiellon incorporated the region and town to the Kingdom of Poland. This caused the Polish–Teutonic Thirteen Years' War, as a result of which in the Second Peace of Thorn (1466) the Teutonic Order ended its claim to the area and recognized it as part of Poland. It was the capital of the Prince-Bishopric of Warmia in the province of Royal Prussia in the larger Greater Poland Province.

Nicolaus Copernicus first visited the town at the turn of 1495 and 1496, and then lived at the castle from 1503. It is believed he wrote part of his De revolutionibus orbium coelestium there.

In the winter of 1703–04 the town was the residence of King Charles XII of Sweden during the Great Northern War. In the mid-18th century a manuscript of the Gesta principum Polonorum, the oldest medieval Polish chronicle was discovered in the castle by Prince-Bishop Adam Stanisław Grabowski, by whose decision it was then published in print for the first time.

The town was annexed with the rest of the region by the Kingdom of Prussia in the First Partition of Poland in 1772. The town ceased to be the capital of the Prince-Bishopric of Warmia, which was disestablished, however it remained the seat of the last Prince-Bishop Ignacy Krasicki until 1795, and afterwards the town lost its cultural significance, which it has not regained since. In 1807 a battle took place near the town between the French under Joachim Murat and Nicolas Jean de Dieu Soult and the Russians and Prussians under Levin August, count von Bennigsen.

From 1933 to 1945 it was the site of the large German government radio station Transmitter Heilsberg. The town was heavily damaged after its conquest by the Soviet Red Army during World War II in 1945. After German surrender, sovereignty over the town was ceremoniously transferred to Polish authorities on May 19, 1945 by the Soviets.

As part of territorial changes demanded by the Soviet Union, Polish rule was accepted at the Potsdam Conference, however, on preliminary terms. Germans were displaced and the town was gradually resettled by Poles, many of them from the parts of eastern Poland annexed by the Soviet Union. The transfer was confirmed by the German–Polish Border Treaty.

== Geography ==
- Elma river, a tributary of the Łyna River near Lidzbark Warmiński

== Sights ==
Landmarks of Lidzbark Warmiński

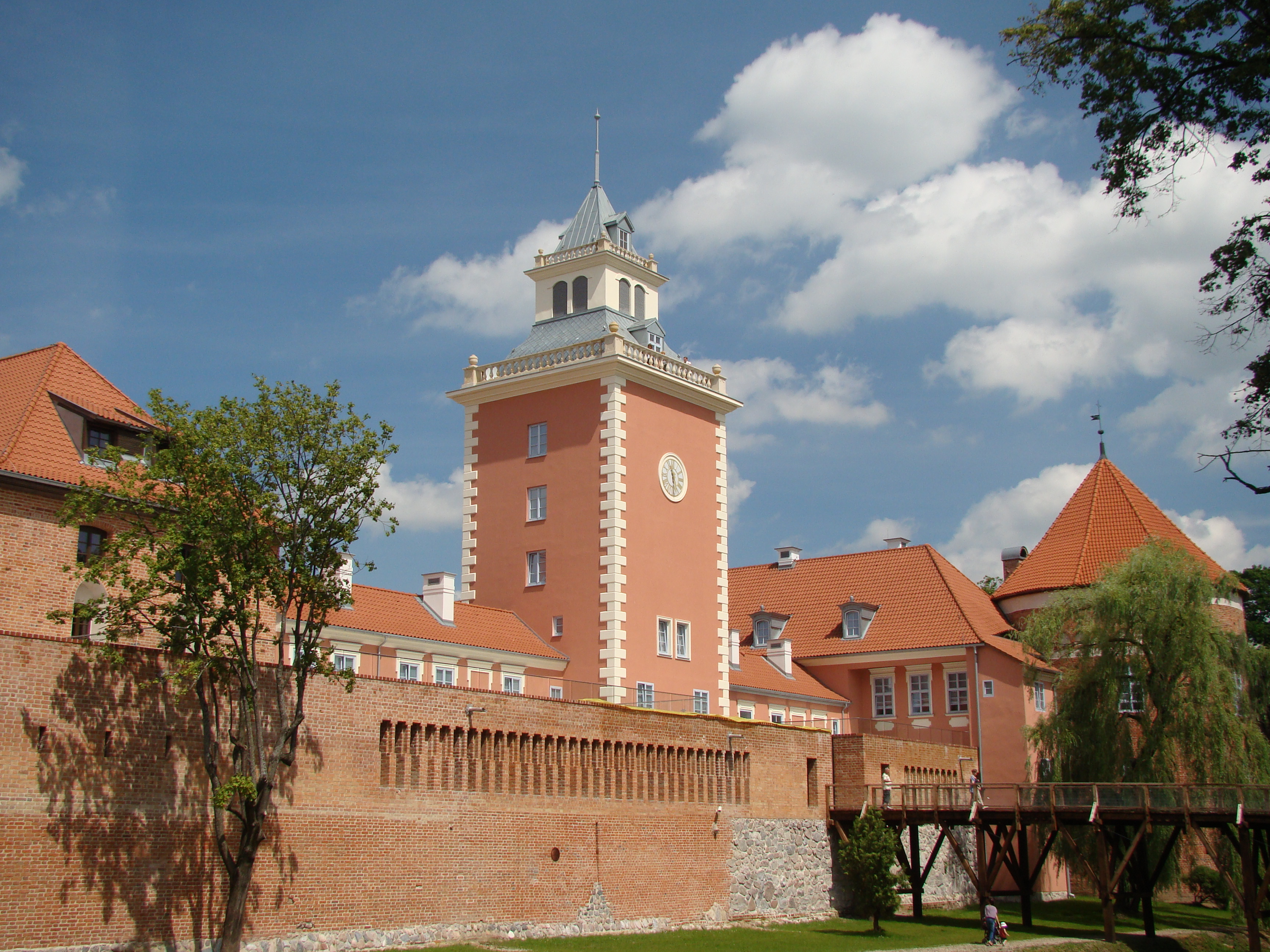
South entrance and fortifications of the castle complex with the gate tower

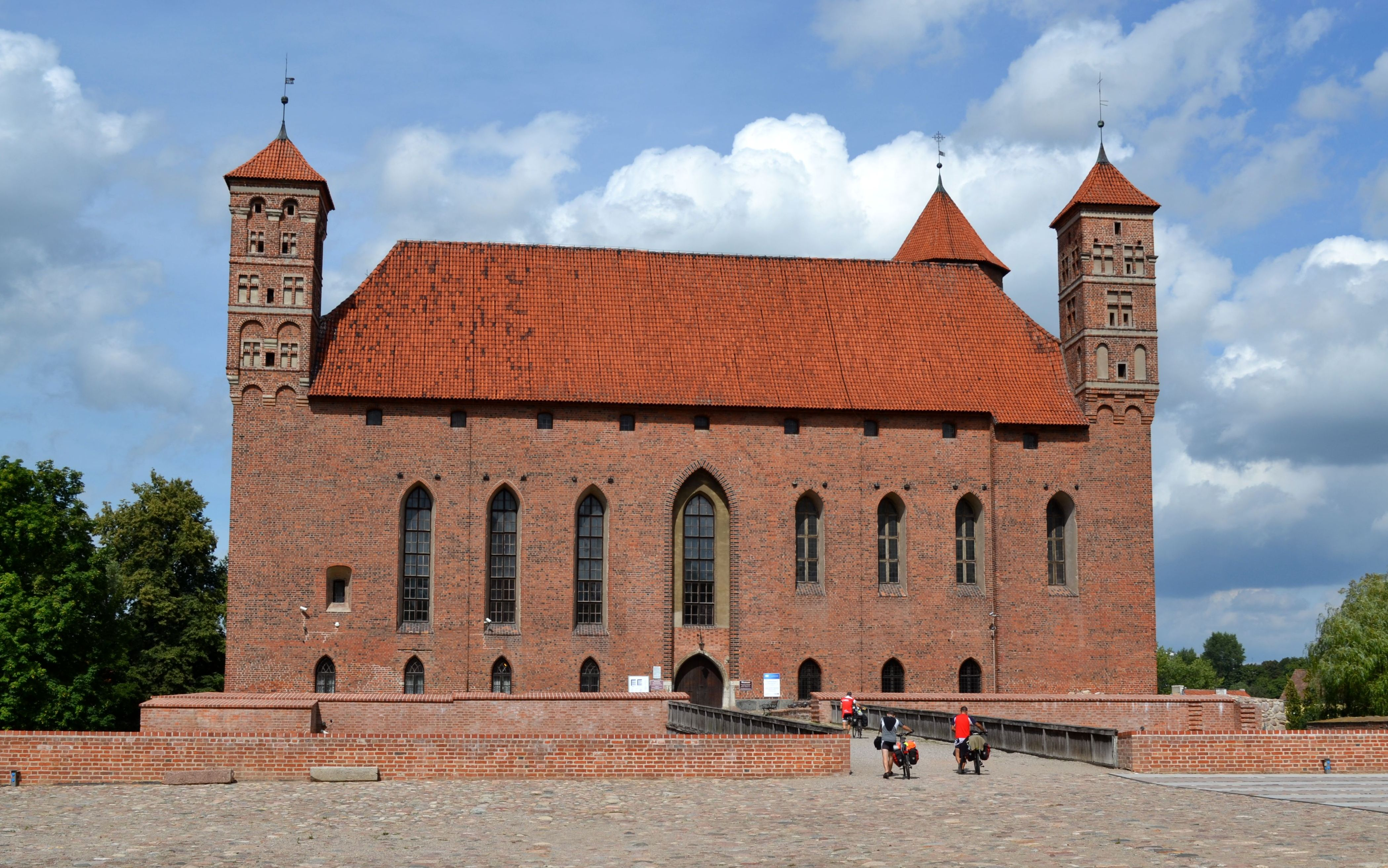
Warmian Bishops' Castle

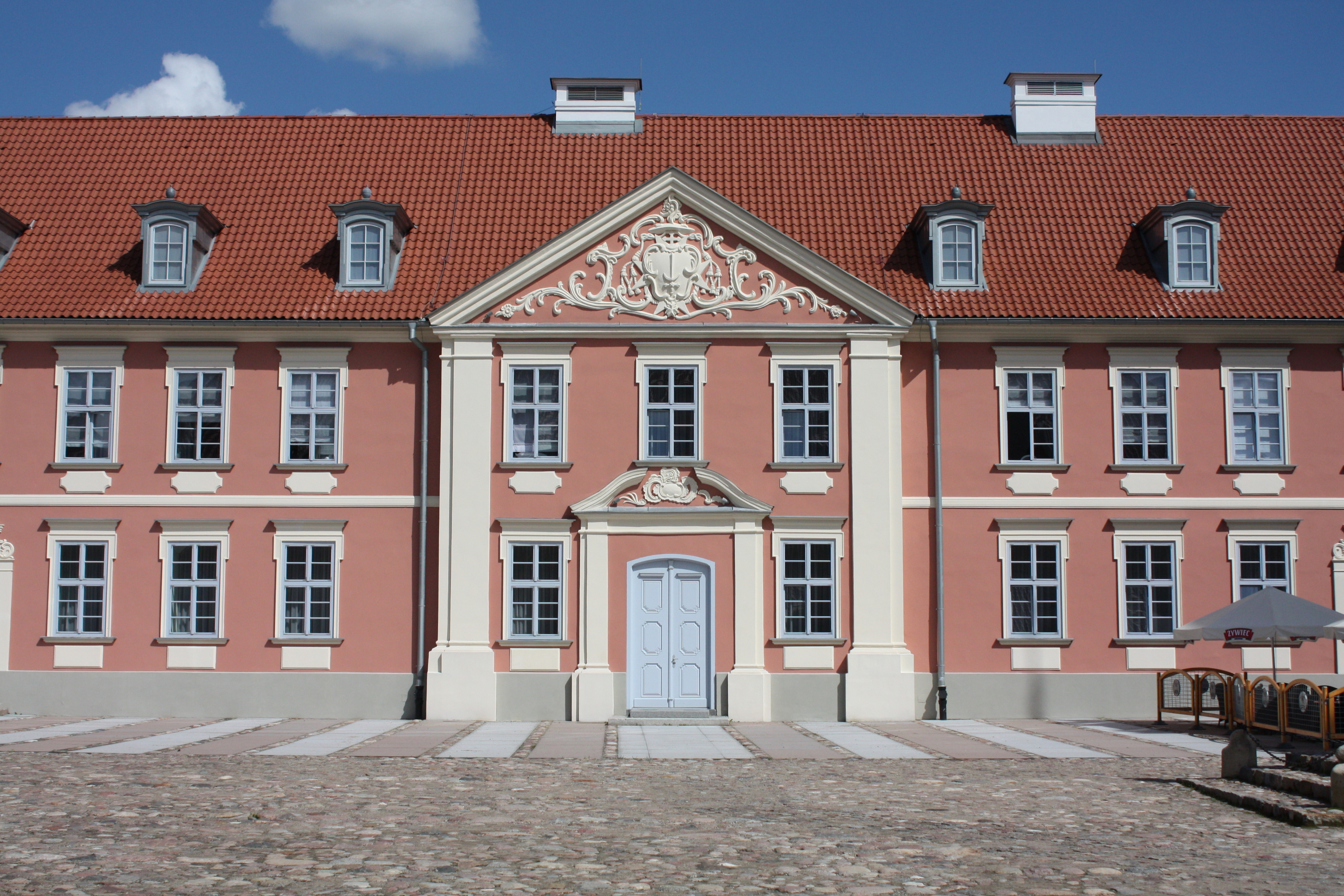
Grabowski Palace

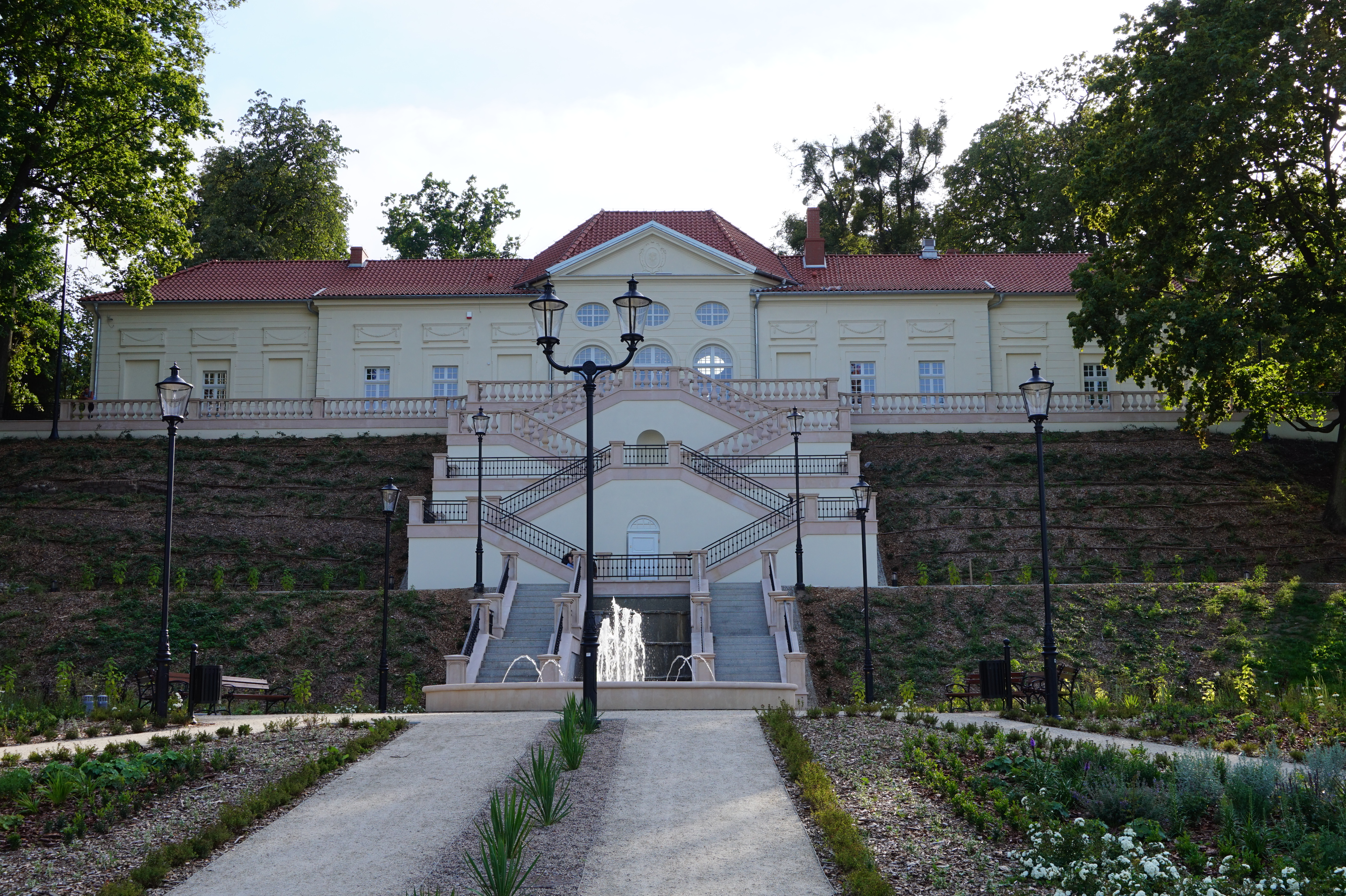
Krasicki Orangery

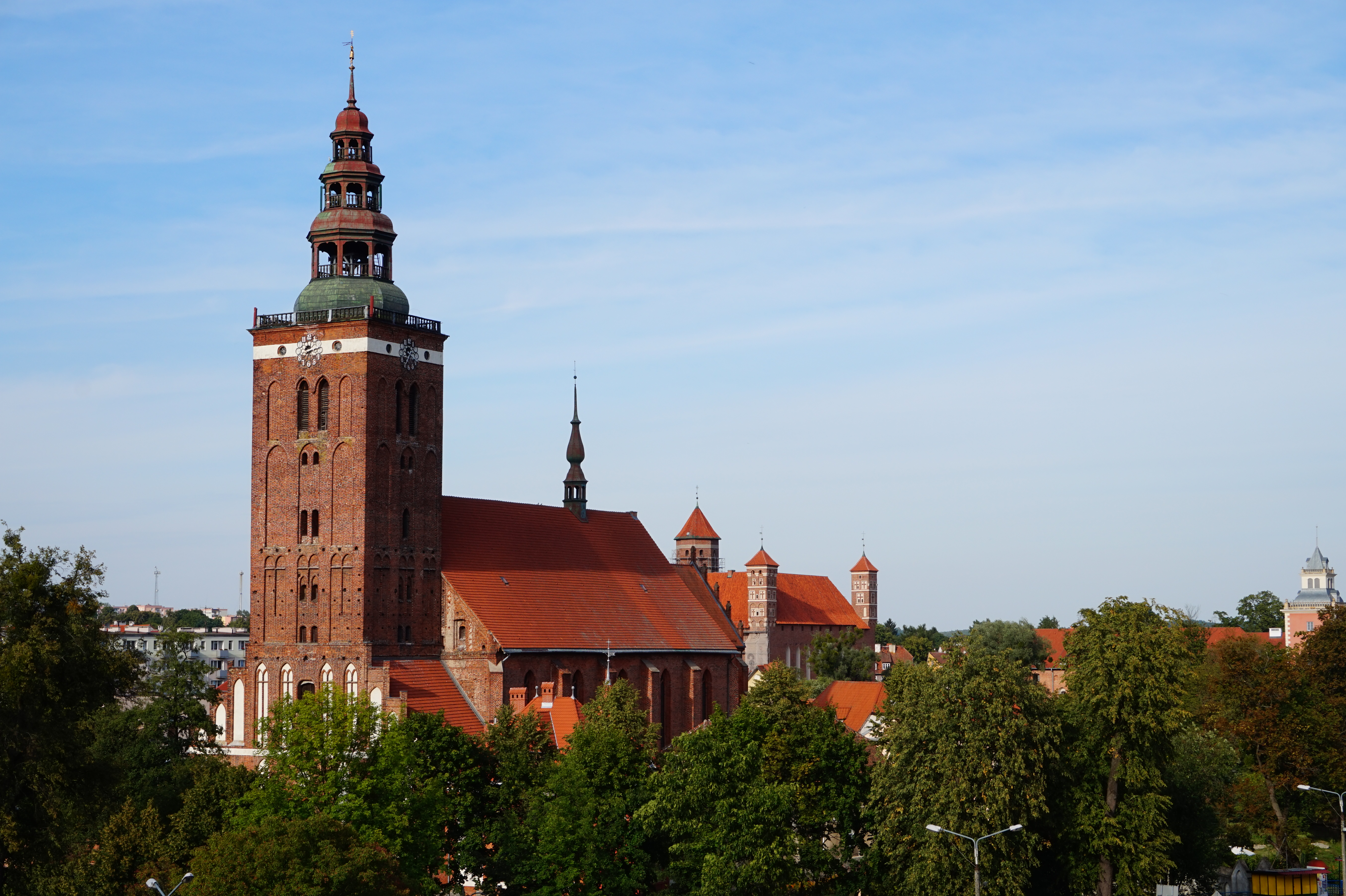
Collegiate church

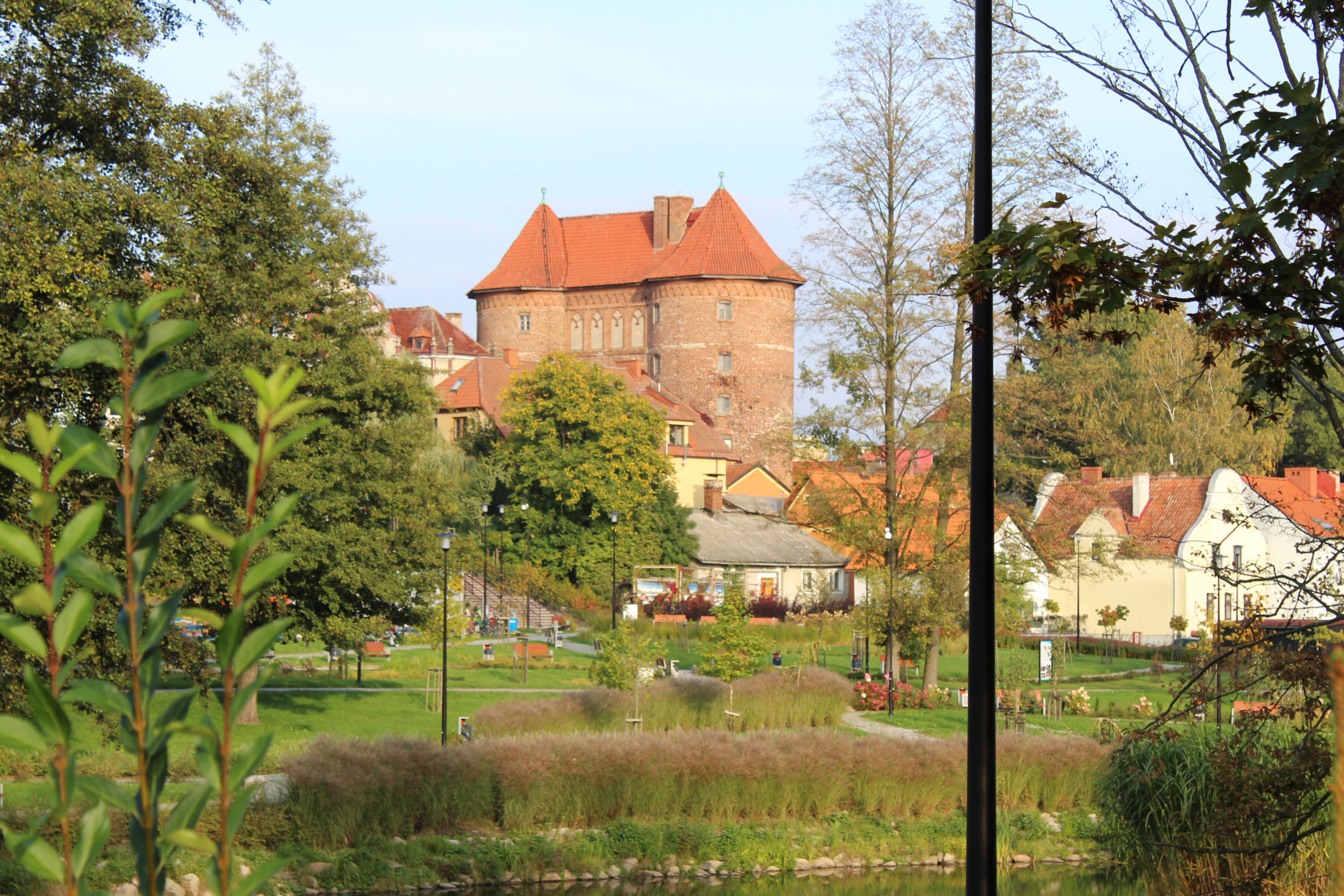
High Gate seen from afar

The main landmark of Lidzbark Warmiński is the Gothic Castle of Warmian Bishops with adjacent fortifications, towers and the Baroque Grabowski Palace. Other sights include:

- Baroque-Neoclassical Krasicki Orangery (Oranżeria Krasickiego)
- Gothic Collegiate church of Saints Peter and Paul
- Medieval town walls and High Gate (Brama Wysoka)
- Baroque Exaltation of the Holy Cross church
- Town hall
- Monument of Ignacy Krasicki

== Education ==
Colleges

- Wszechnica Warmińska - non-state college founded on 20 November 2003

High schools

- Comprehensive Schools im. Kazimierza Jagiellończyka
- Trade Schools im. Stanisława Staszica
- Farmer School
- Catholic High School

Primary schools

- Primary School No. 1 im. Mikołaja Kopernika
- Primary School No. 3 im. Ignacego Krasickiego
- Primary School No. 4 im. Jana Pawła II

Music schools

- National Music School I Level

Kindergartens

- Non-Public Kindergarten "Kubuś"
- Non-Public Kindergarten "Miś"
- Non-Public Kindergarten "Puchatek"
- Public Kindergarten No. 5
- Public Kindergarten No. 6

Other educational institutions

- Youth Educational Centre im. Marii Grzegorzewskiej
- Psychological and Pedagogical Counseling Centre
- Special School and Educational Centre

== Sports ==
The local football team is Polonia Lidzbark Warmiński. It competes in the lower leagues.

== Transport ==
National road 51 passes through Lidzbark Warmiński.

=== Bus ===
In 2021, local buses were introduced for the very first time.

List of routes by line number:

- Line 1: Astronomów - Chopina Tężnie (via Wyszyńskiego and Mławską)
- Line 2: Kolejowa Dworzec/Bema - Sosnowa (via Olsztyńską and Mławską)
- Line 3: Astronomów - Chopina Tężnie (via Ornecką and Wiejską)
- Line 4: Astronomów - Sosnowa (via Olsztyńską and Mławską)
- Line 5: Sosnowa - Chopina Tężnie (via Olsztyńską and Mławską)

The main bus terminal is located at the former railway station.

=== Rail ===
Until 1996, the town was served by passenger trains. The station building is now a local museum, gift shop, and waiting room for the bus terminal. In June of 2025, mayor Jacek Wiśniowski, proposed to restore the abandoned railway line, to bring back the railway connection to Lidzbark Warmiński. This restoration is estimated to cost 1 billion PLN.

== Twin towns – sister cities ==
Lidzbark Warmiński is twinned with:

- Oud-Beijerland, Netherlands (1992)
- Milanówek, Poland (2001)
- Sovetsk, Kaliningrad Oblast, Russia (2001)
- Werlte, Germany (2005)

== Notable people ==
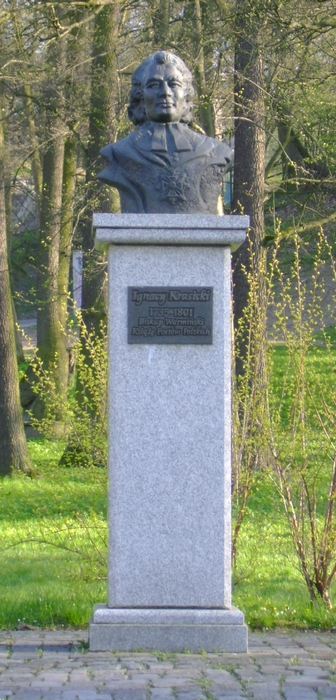
Monument of Ignacy Krasicki

- Mauritius Ferber (1471–1537), member of the patrician Ferber family and Roman Catholic Prince-Bishop of Warmia
- Nicolaus Copernicus (1473–1547), astronomer, mathematician, physician, and canon
- Stanislaus Hosius (Stanisław Hozjusz) (1504–1579), Polish Roman Catholic cardinal, Prince-Bishop of Warmia
- John Albert Vasa (Jan Albert Waza) (1612–1634), Polish prince, cardinal, Prince-Bishop of Warmia and Kraków,
- Teodor Andrzej Potocki (1664–1738), Prince-Bishop of Warmia, Primate of Poland, interrex in 1733
- Józef Korzeniewski (ca. 1732–ca. 1780), Polish painter and draughtsman
- Ignacy Krasicki (1735–1801), Prince-Bishop of Warmia, Primate of Poland, leading Polish Enlightenment poet
- Ernst Burchard (1876–1920), doctor and scientist
- Dorothee Rätsch (born 1940), German sculptor and graphic artist
- Andrzej Rozbicki (born 1948), Polish-Canadian conductor and music educator
- Zbigniew Mikołejko (born 1951), Polish philosopher and historian of religion, essayist
- Tadeusz Płoski (1956–2010), Military Ordinariate of Poland, victim of the Smolensk air disaster
- Marek Mikulski (born 1981), Polish Olympic wrestler
- Dawid Szymonowicz (born 1995), Polish footballer
