= Sątopy-Samulewo =

Sątopy-Samulewo Bischdorf (German)
- Village
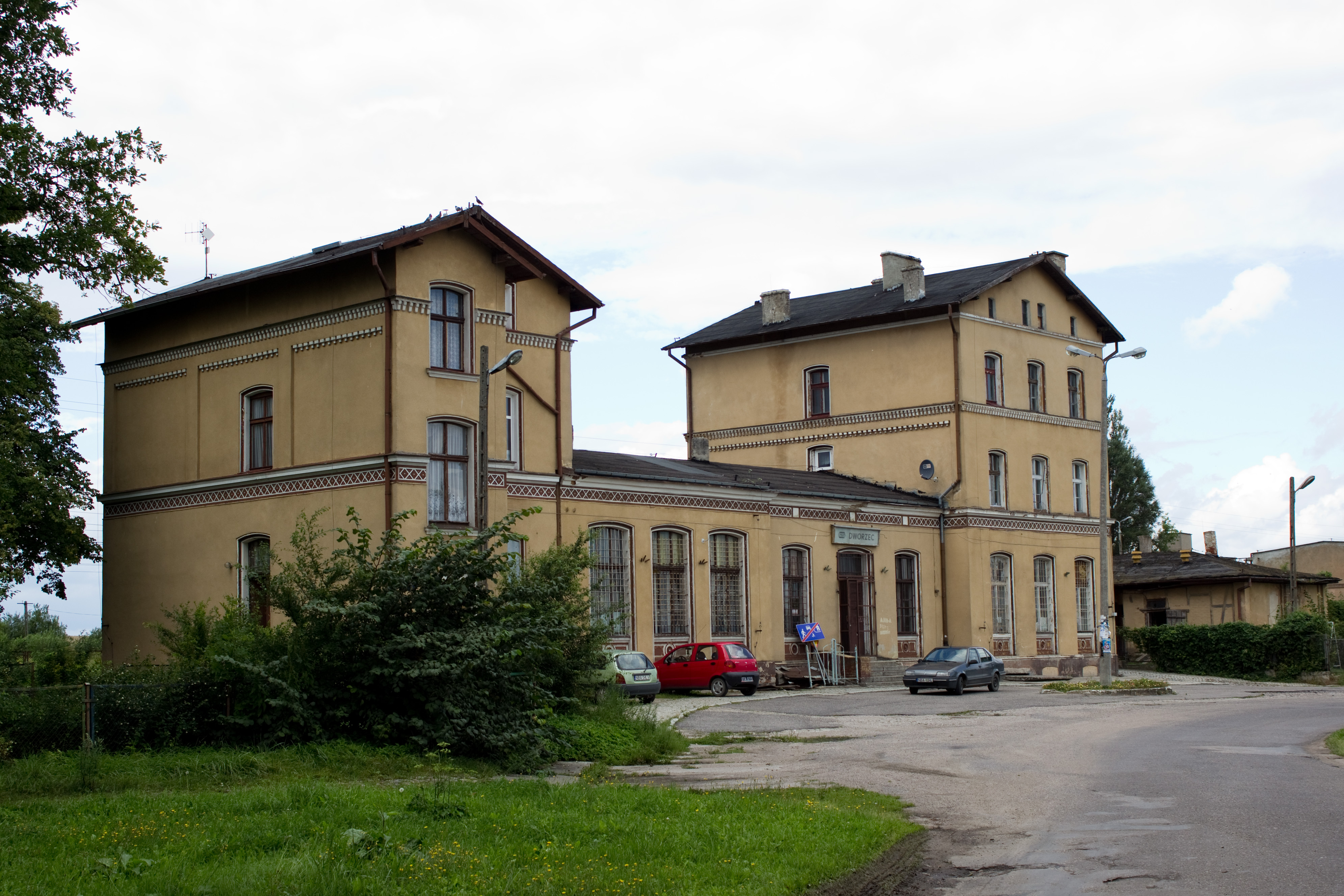
- Sątopy-Samulewo railway station

- Location within Poland
- Coordinates: 54°04′25″N 21°01′36″E
- Country: Poland
- Voivodeship: Warmian–Masurian
- County: Bartoszyce
- Gmina: Bisztynek
- Population (2011): 1,200
- Postal code: 11-230
- Area code: +48 89
- Vehicle registration: NBA

Sątopy-Samulewo (German: Bischdorf) is a village in the administrative district of Gmina Bisztynek, within Bartoszyce County, Warmian–Masurian Voivodeship, in north-eastern Poland.

From 1975 to 1998, Sątopy-Samulewo was in the Olsztyn Voivodeship.

== History ==
The first human settlement in the area dates back to prehistoric times, as flint dating from around this period found. The other oldest discoveries date back to the Stone Age, which included flint, once again, and a stone axe, which was discovered by a resident in 1993. During the construction of the railway station in 1873, 200-300 urns with bone remains were discovered.

Until 1772 Sątopy-Samulewo was in the Prince-Bishopric of Warmia, within Reszel.
