= Miecznikowo =

Miecznikowo may refer to the following places in Poland:

- Miecznikowo-Cygany
- Miecznikowo-Gołębie
- Miecznikowo-Kołaki
- Miecznikowo-Miąchy
- Miecznikowo-Siwe
- Miecznikowo-Sowy
