= Puchałowo =

- Village
- Location within Poland
- Coordinates: 53°23′N 20°44′E
- Country: Poland
- Voivodeship: Warmian-Masurian
- County: Nidzica
- Gmina: Janowo

Puchałowo [puxaˈwɔvɔ] is a largely abandoned village in the administrative district of Gmina Janowo, within Nidzica County, Warmian-Masurian Voivodeship, in northern Poland.

As a result of a decision about the expansion of the Muszaki proving ground, the population of the village was resettled and most of the village razed to the ground. Only a few houses remains, making it very similar to what is left from Ulesie, which also was largely razed to the ground as a result of the proving ground expansion.
