= Waśniewo =

Waśniewo may refer to the following places in Poland:

- Waśniewo-Grabowo
- Waśniewo-Gwoździe
