= Kalkownia =

- Settlement
- Location within Poland
- Coordinates: 53°28′50″N 20°22′31″E
- Country: Poland
- Voivodeship: Warmian-Masurian
- County: Nidzica
- Gmina: Nidzica

Kalkownia [kalˈkɔvɲa] is a settlement in the administrative district of Gmina Nidzica, within Nidzica County, Warmian–Masurian Voivodeship, in northern Poland. The town was part of the village of Bolejny.

In the 1975–1998 period, the town administratively belonged to the Olsztyn Voivodeship.
