= Marek Tomaszycki =

Polish officer

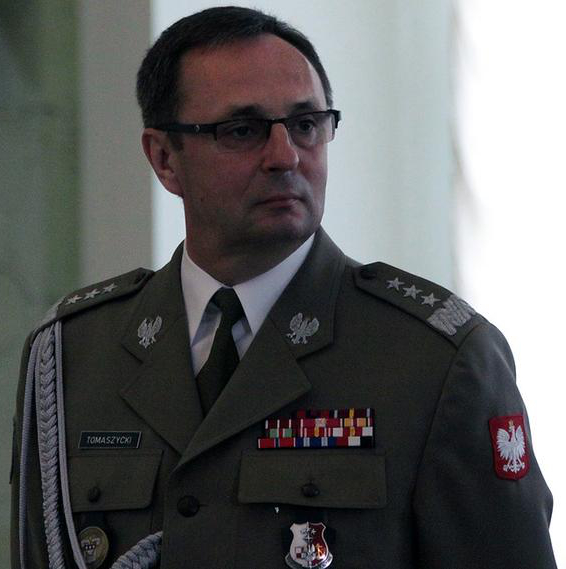
- Born: Marek Ziemowit Tomaszycki; 28 January 1958 (age 68); Napiwoda, Poland
- Military career
- Allegiance: Poland
- Branch: Polish Land Forces
- Service years: 1981–2017
- Rank: General

Marek Ziemowit Tomaszycki (born 28 January 1958), is a Polish army officer.

== Early life ==
Marek Tomaszycki was born on 28 January 1958. He graduated from the Mechanized Forces Officers' School in Wrocław in 1981.

== Career ==
He started his military service in 1981 as a commander of an infantry platoon in the 32nd Mechanized Regiment in Kołobrzeg.

In later years, he served in the 8th Mechanized Brigade and the staff of the 8th Coastal Protection Division.

He graduated from the National Defense Academy in 1995.

From 1996 to 1999 he was the training chief and deputy commander of the 36th Armored Brigade, and between 1999 and 2001, he was the commander of the 9th Armored Cavalry Brigade.

He attended an operational and tactical course for NATO integration at the National Defense Academy in 1999.

During the next two years, he was the head of the Reconnaissance and WRE division of the 1st Mechanized Corps. From July 2003 to February 2004 he was the head of the Training Department of the Polish Military Contingent in Iraq. After completing the mission, he returned to his previous position. He is a postgraduate operational and strategic studies at NDA in 2003. He was part of the Defense Policy Study Military Academy of the Land Forces in Carlisle Barracks in the United States.

From 2004 to 2005, he commanded the 6th Armored Cavalry Brigade. In 2006, he became the commander of the 10th Armored Cavalry Brigade in Świętoszów. In the same year he was promoted to the rank of Brigadier General.

In March 2007, he flew with his soldiers to Afghanistan, where he was the commander of the Polish Military Contingent until November 2007. In November 2007 he was promoted to the rank of Major General.

General Tomaszycki ceased to act as the commander of the 10th Armored Cavalry Brigade on 8 January 2008. He was transferred to the personnel reserve of the Ministry of National Defense by Minister Bogdan Klich - until the circumstances related to the investigation conducted by the military prosecutor's office concerning the Nangar Khel incident were clarified.

In April 2008, Tomaszycki was restored to active service, becoming the Chief of the P-7 Training Board of the General Staff of the Polish Army, to which he was appointed by Aleksander Szczygło. On 9 July 2009, he became the commander of the 12th Mechanized Division in Szczecin.

In 2011, he was appointed the head of training of the Land Forces. On 23 April 2013, Polish President Bronisław Komorowski appointed him on May 20, 2013, as the Operational Commander of the Armed Forces. On 1 August 2013, he was promoted to the rank of Lieutenant General.

On 17 December 2013, in the Belweder Palace, President Komorowski dismissed him from the position of the Operational Commander of the Armed Forces and at the same time appointed him, as of 1 January 2014 for the position of the Operational Commander of the Armed Forces.

In May 2015, Tomaszycki was sanctioned by Russia during the Russo-Ukrainian War.

On 22 June 2015, at the request of Prime Minister Ewa Kopacz, President Komorowski appointed Tomaszycki as Supreme Commander of the Armed Forces during the war.

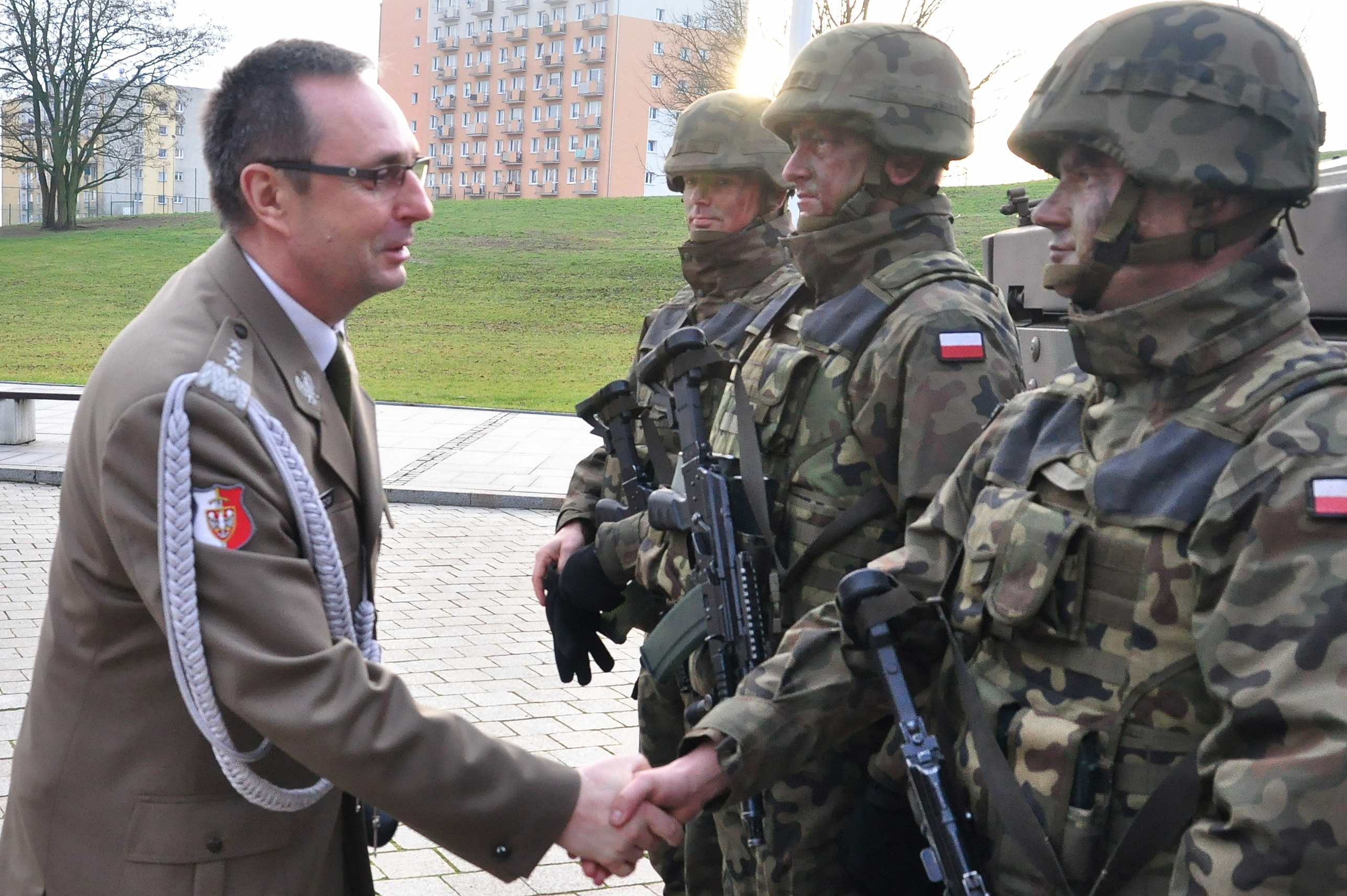
Tomaszycki in 2015 with his conversation with the soldiers

On 28 April 2017, Tomaszycki retired from professional military service.
