= Natać =

Natać may refer to the following places in Poland:

- Natać Mała
- Natać Wielka
