= Szemplino =

Szemplino may refer to the following places in Poland:

- Szemplino Czarne
- Szemplino Wielkie
