= Ulesie, Warmian-Masurian Voivodeship =

Ulesie
- Settlement
- Location within Poland
- Coordinates: 53°23′N 20°30′E
- Country: Poland
- Voivodeship: Warmian-Masurian
- County: Nidzica
- Gmina: Janowo

Ulesie [uˈlɛɕɛ] is a small settlement in the administrative district of Gmina Janowo, within Nidzica County, Warmian-Masurian Voivodeship, in northern Poland.

The reason for the settlement being small is the decision to expand the Muszaki proving ground in this area. As a result, only a small bit of the village is inhabited while older houses no longer exist. A similar thing happened with the nearby Puchałowo.
