= Połcie Młode =

- Village
- Location within Poland
- Coordinates: 53°18′48″N 20°33′34″E
- Country: Poland
- Voivodeship: Warmian-Masurian
- County: Nidzica
- Gmina: Janowiec Kościelny

Połcie Młode [ˈpɔu̯t͡ɕe-'mwɔdɛ] is a village in the administrative district of Gmina Janowiec Kościelny, within Nidzica County, Warmian-Masurian Voivodeship, in northern Poland.

It is part of Stare Połcie (in Polish meaning the old Połcie, Połcie Młode being Połcie the young).
