= Kamionka, Nidzica County =

Kamionka
- Village
- Location within Poland
- Coordinates: 53°19′N 20°25′E
- Country: Poland
- Voivodeship: Warmian-Masurian
- County: Nidzica
- Gmina: Nidzica

Kamionka [kaˈmjɔnka] is a village in the administrative district of Gmina Nidzica, within Nidzica County, Warmian-Masurian Voivodeship, in northern Poland.
