= Zimna Woda, Nidzica County =

Zimna Woda
- Village
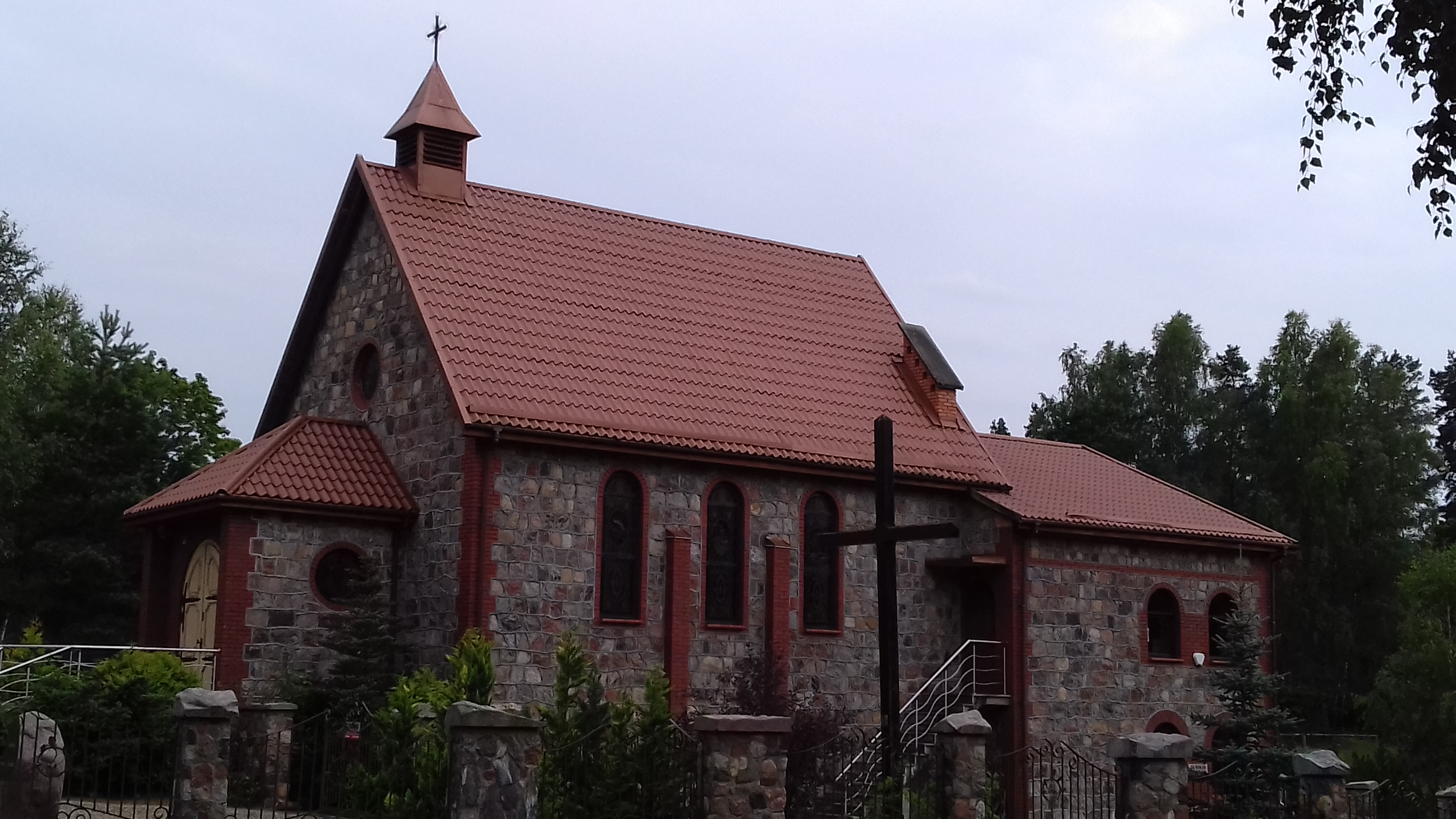
- Saint Hubertus church in Zimna Woda

- Location within Poland
- Coordinates: 53°27′N 20°35′E
- Country: Poland
- Voivodeship: Warmian-Masurian
- County: Nidzica
- Gmina: Nidzica
- Population: 84
- Website: www.zimnawoda.pl

Zimna Woda [ˈʑimna ˈvɔda] is a village in the administrative district of Gmina Nidzica, within Nidzica County, Warmian-Masurian Voivodeship, in northern Poland.
