= Krajewo Małe =

- Settlement
- Location within Poland
- Coordinates: 53°20′N 20°33′E
- Country: Poland
- Voivodeship: Warmian-Masurian
- County: Nidzica
- Gmina: Janowiec Kościelny

Krajewo Małe [kraˈjɛvɔ ˈmawɛ] is a settlement in the administrative district of Gmina Janowiec Kościelny, within Nidzica County, Warmian-Masurian Voivodeship, in northern Poland.
