= Jabłonowo-Maćkowięta =

- Village
- Location within Poland
- Coordinates: 53°14′50″N 20°29′30″E
- Country: Poland
- Voivodeship: Warmian-Masurian
- County: Nidzica
- Gmina: Janowiec Kościelny

Jabłonowo-Maćkowięta [jabwɔˈnɔvɔ mat͡ɕkɔˈvjɛnta] is a village in the administrative district of Gmina Janowiec Kościelny, within Nidzica County, Warmian-Masurian Voivodeship, in northern Poland.
