= Stare Połcie =

- Village
- Location within Poland
- Coordinates: 53°18′32″N 20°32′57″E
- Country: Poland
- Voivodeship: Warmian-Masurian
- County: Nidzica
- Gmina: Janowiec Kościelny
- Population: 130

Stare Połcie [ˈstarɛ ˈpɔu̯t͡ɕɛ] is a village in the administrative district of Gmina Janowiec Kościelny, within Nidzica County, Warmian-Masurian Voivodeship, in northern Poland.

== See also ==
- Połcie Młode, a small village part of Stare Połcie.
