= Krajewo-Kawęczyno =

- Settlement
- Location within Poland
- Coordinates: 53°17′13″N 20°36′19″E
- Country: Poland
- Voivodeship: Warmian-Masurian
- County: Nidzica
- Gmina: Janowiec Kościelny
- Website: http://agrokrajewo.com

Krajewo-Kawęczyno [kraˈjɛvɔ kavɛnˈt͡ʂɨnɔ] is a settlement in the administrative district of Gmina Janowiec Kościelny, within Nidzica County, Warmian-Masurian Voivodeship, in northern Poland.
