= Dobrzyń, Warmian-Masurian Voivodeship =

Dobrzyń
- Village
- Location within Poland
- Coordinates: 53°25′36″N 20°21′56″E
- Country: Poland
- Voivodeship: Warmian-Masurian
- County: Nidzica
- Gmina: Nidzica
- Population: 150

Dobrzyń ([ˈdɔbʐɨɲ]; German: Gutfeld) is a little village in the administrative district of Gmina Nidzica, within Nidzica County, Warmian-Masurian Voivodeship, in northern Poland.
