= Łączki, Warmian-Masurian Voivodeship =

Łączki
- Settlement
- Location within Poland
- Coordinates: 53°21′19″N 20°21′20″E
- Country: Poland
- Voivodeship: Warmian-Masurian
- County: Nidzica
- Gmina: Nidzica

Łączki [ˈwɔnt͡ʂki] is a settlement in the administrative district of Gmina Nidzica, within Nidzica County, Warmian-Masurian Voivodeship, in northern Poland.
