= Bukowiec Wielki =

- Village
- Location within Poland
- Coordinates: 53°15′48″N 20°33′16″E
- Country: Poland
- Voivodeship: Warmian-Masurian
- County: Nidzica
- Gmina: Janowiec Kościelny
- Population: 50

Bukowiec Wielki (Polish pronunciation: [buˈkɔvjɛts ˈfjɛlkʲi]) is a village in the administrative district of Gmina Janowiec Kościelny, within Nidzica County, Warmian-Masurian Voivodeship, in northern Poland.
