= Powierz =

- Village
- Location within Poland
- Coordinates: 53°16′23″N 20°25′45″E
- Country: Poland
- Voivodeship: Warmian-Masurian
- County: Nidzica
- Gmina: Janowiec Kościelny
- Population: 100

Powierz ([ˈpɔvjɛʂ]; German: Powiersen, 1938–45 Waldbeek) is a village in the administrative district of Gmina Janowiec Kościelny, within Nidzica County, Warmian-Masurian Voivodeship, in northern Poland.
