= Wichrowiec =

- Village
- Location within Poland
- Coordinates: 53°22′N 20°42′E
- Country: Poland
- Voivodeship: Warmian-Masurian
- County: Nidzica
- Gmina: Janowo
- Population: 360

Wichrowiec [viˈxrɔvjɛt͡s] is a village in the administrative district of Gmina Janowo, within Nidzica County, Warmian-Masurian Voivodeship, in northern Poland.

== Notable residents ==
- Fritz Maxin (1885–1960), German politician
