= Piotrkowo, Nidzica County =

Piotrkowo
- Village
- Location within Poland
- Coordinates: 53°16′N 20°33′E
- Country: Poland
- Voivodeship: Warmian-Masurian
- County: Nidzica
- Gmina: Janowiec Kościelny
- Population: 60

Piotrkowo [pjɔtrˈkɔvɔ] is a village in the administrative district of Gmina Janowiec Kościelny, within Nidzica County, Warmian-Masurian Voivodeship, in northern Poland.
