= Kownatki-Falęcino =

- Village
- Location within Poland
- Coordinates: 53°14′22″N 20°28′12″E
- Country: Poland
- Voivodeship: Warmian-Masurian
- County: Nidzica
- Gmina: Janowiec Kościelny
- Population: 16

Kownatki-Falęcino [kɔvˈnatki falɛnˈt͡ɕinɔ] is a village in the administrative district of Gmina Janowiec Kościelny, within Nidzica County, Warmian-Masurian Voivodeship, in northern Poland.
