= Bielawy, Warmian-Masurian Voivodeship =

Bielawy
- Village
- Location within Poland
- Coordinates: 53°15′N 20°32′E
- Country: Poland
- Voivodeship: Warmian-Masurian
- County: Nidzica
- Gmina: Janowiec Kościelny

Population
  - Total: 160
- Postal code: 13-111
- Vehicle registration: NNI

Bielawy [bjɛˈlavɨ] is a village in the administrative district of Gmina Janowiec Kościelny, within Nidzica County, Warmian-Masurian Voivodeship, in northern Poland.
