= Mogiłowo =

- Settlement
- Location within Poland
- Coordinates: 53°25′24″N 20°19′41″E
- Country: Poland
- Voivodeship: Warmian-Masurian
- County: Nidzica
- Gmina: Nidzica

Mogiłowo [mɔɡiˈwɔvɔ] is a settlement in the administrative district of Gmina Nidzica, within Nidzica County, Warmian-Masurian Voivodeship, in northern Poland.
