= Rembowo, Warmian-Masurian Voivodeship =

Rembowo
- Village
- Location within Poland
- Coordinates: 53°11′24″N 20°46′27″E
- Country: Poland
- Voivodeship: Warmian-Masurian
- County: Nidzica
- Gmina: Janowo

Rembowo [rɛmˈbɔvɔ] is a village in the administrative district of Gmina Janowo, within Nidzica County, Warmian-Masurian Voivodeship, in northern Poland.
