= Wolisko, Nidzica County =

Wolisko
- Village
- Location within Poland
- Coordinates: 53°23′36″N 20°31′31″E
- Country: Poland
- Voivodeship: Warmian-Masurian
- County: Nidzica
- Gmina: Nidzica

Wolisko [vɔˈliskɔ] is a village in the administrative district of Gmina Nidzica, within Nidzica County, Warmian-Masurian Voivodeship, in northern Poland.
