= Wały, Nidzica County =

Wały
- Village
- Location within Poland
- Coordinates: 53°25′N 20°33′E
- Country: Poland
- Voivodeship: Warmian-Masurian
- County: Nidzica
- Gmina: Nidzica
- Population: 260

Wały [ˈvawɨ] is a village in the administrative district of Gmina Nidzica, within Nidzica County, Warmian-Masurian Voivodeship, in northern Poland.
