= Krusze =

Krusze may refer to the following places:

- Krusze, Kuyavian-Pomeranian Voivodeship (north-central Poland)
- Krusze, Masovian Voivodeship (east-central Poland)
- Krusze, Warmian-Masurian Voivodeship (north Poland)
- Krusze, West Pomeranian Voivodeship (north-west Poland)
