= Olszewko, Warmian-Masurian Voivodeship =

Olszewko
- Village
- Location within Poland
- Coordinates: 53°21′N 20°24′E
- Country: Poland
- Voivodeship: Warmian-Masurian
- County: Nidzica
- Gmina: Nidzica

Olszewko [ɔlˈʂɛfkɔ] is a village in the administrative district of Gmina Nidzica, within Nidzica County, Warmian-Masurian Voivodeship, in Northern Poland.
