= Smolany-Żardawy =

- Village
- Location within Poland
- Coordinates: 53°19′14″N 20°35′03″E
- Country: Poland
- Voivodeship: Warmian-Masurian
- County: Nidzica
- Gmina: Janowiec Kościelny
- Population: 100

Smolany-Żardawy [smɔˈlanɨ ʐarˈdavɨ] is a village in the administrative district of Gmina Janowiec Kościelny, within Nidzica County, Warmian-Masurian Voivodeship, in northern Poland.
