= Ruskowo =

- Village
- Location within Poland
- Coordinates: 53°17′34″N 20°51′30″E
- Country: Poland
- Voivodeship: Warmian-Masurian
- County: Nidzica
- Gmina: Janowo

Ruskowo [rusˈkɔvɔ] is a village in the administrative district of Gmina Janowo, within Nidzica County, Warmian-Masurian Voivodeship, in northern Poland.
