= Moczysko =

- Settlement
- Location within Poland
- Coordinates: 53°27′N 20°32′E
- Country: Poland
- Voivodeship: Warmian-Masurian
- County: Nidzica
- Gmina: Nidzica

Moczysko [mɔˈt͡ʂɨskɔ] is a settlement in the administrative district of Gmina Nidzica, within Nidzica County, Warmian-Masurian Voivodeship, in northern Poland.
