= Wiłunie =

- Village
- Location within Poland
- Coordinates: 53°18′N 20°28′E
- Country: Poland
- Voivodeship: Warmian-Masurian
- County: Nidzica
- Gmina: Janowiec Kościelny

Wiłunie ([viˈwuɲɛ]; German: Willuhnen) is a village in the administrative district of Gmina Janowiec Kościelny, within Nidzica County, Warmian-Masurian Voivodeship, in northern Poland.
