= Żabino-Arguły =

- Settlement
- Location within Poland
- Coordinates: 53°15′44″N 20°31′10″E
- Country: Poland
- Voivodeship: Warmian-Masurian
- County: Nidzica
- Gmina: Janowiec Kościelny

Żabino-Arguły [ʐaˈbinɔ arˈɡuwɨ] is a settlement in the administrative district of Gmina Janowiec Kościelny, within Nidzica County, Warmian-Masurian Voivodeship, in northern Poland.
