= Grabowo Leśne =

- Settlement
- Location within Poland
- Coordinates: 53°15′04″N 20°26′23″E
- Country: Poland
- Voivodeship: Warmian-Masurian
- County: Nidzica
- Gmina: Janowiec Kościelny

Grabowo Leśne ([ɡraˈbɔvɔ ˈlɛɕnɛ]; German: Grabowo, 1938–45 Hasenheide) is a settlement in the administrative district of Gmina Janowiec Kościelny, within Nidzica County, Warmian-Masurian Voivodeship, in northern Poland.
