= Parowa =

Parowa may refer to the following places in Poland:

- Parowa, Lower Silesian Voivodeship (south-west Poland)
- Parowa, Pomeranian Voivodeship (north Poland)
- Parowa, Nidzica County in Warmian-Masurian Voivodeship (north Poland)
- Parowa, Węgorzewo County in Warmian-Masurian Voivodeship (north Poland)
- Parowa (village) in Nalbari
