= Litwinki, Warmian-Masurian Voivodeship =

Litwinki
- Village
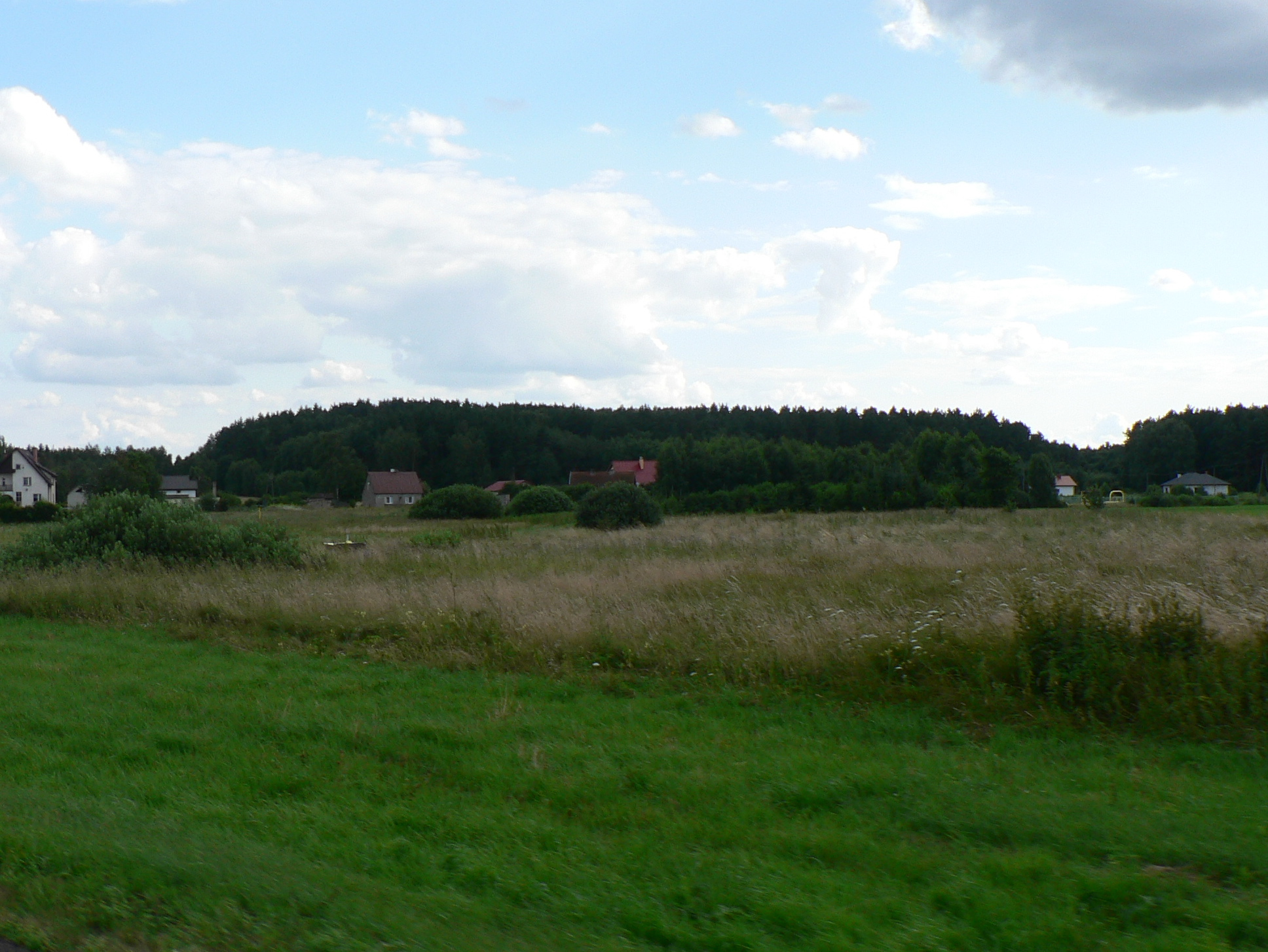

- Location within Poland
- Coordinates: 53°22′50″N 20°22′59″E
- Country: Poland
- Voivodeship: Warmian-Masurian
- County: Nidzica
- Gmina: Nidzica

Litwinki [litˈfinki] is a village in the administrative district of Gmina Nidzica, within Nidzica County, Warmian-Masurian Voivodeship, in northern Poland.

In 1679, Litwinki was one of the villages where King John III Sobieski settled his Muslim soldiers.
