= Sołdany Wielkie =

- Village
- Location within Poland
- Coordinates: 53°16′31″N 20°34′10″E
- Country: Poland
- Voivodeship: Warmian-Masurian
- County: Nidzica
- Gmina: Janowiec Kościelny

Sołdany Wielkie [sɔu̯ˈdanɨ ˈvjɛlkʲɛ] is a village in the administrative district of Gmina Janowiec Kościelny, within Nidzica County, Warmian-Masurian Voivodeship, in northern Poland.
