= Lake Ukiel =

Lake in Olsztyn, Poland

- Krzywe Lake
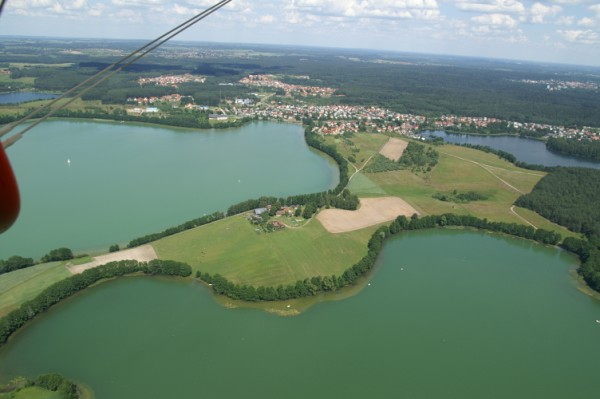
- A bird's-eye view of Likusy

- Location within Warmian-Masurian Voivodeship
- Location: Olsztyn
- Coordinates: 53°47′N 20°25′E
- Catchment area: 25.9 km^{2} (10.0 sq mi)
- Basin countries: Poland
- Surface area: 412 ha (1,020 acres)
- Average depth: 10.6 m (35 ft)
- Max. depth: 43 m (141 ft)

Lake Ukiel (or Krzywe Lake - informal name) is a lake in Poland which is located on Pojezierze Olsztyńskie, in the northwest part of Olsztyn, between district Dajtki, Gutkowo and Likusy.

- Lake's volume: 43,611.5 thous. m³
- Degree of purity: II (2004)
- Category of susceptibility to degradation: II (2004)

Ukiel is the biggest lake in Olsztyn. There are pensions, hotels and a municipal beach.
