= Ryki-Borkowo =

- Village
- Location within Poland
- Coordinates: 53°18′53″N 20°43′43″E
- Country: Poland
- Voivodeship: Warmian-Masurian
- County: Nidzica
- Gmina: Janowo
- Population: 90

Ryki-Borkowo [ˈrɨki bɔrˈkɔvɔ] is a village in the administrative district of Gmina Janowo, within Nidzica County, Warmian-Masurian Voivodeship, in northern Poland.
