= Żabino-Gąsiory =

- Settlement
- Location within Poland
- Coordinates: 53°15′31″N 20°30′31″E
- Country: Poland
- Voivodeship: Warmian-Masurian
- County: Nidzica
- Gmina: Janowiec Kościelny

Żabino-Gąsiory [ʐaˈbinɔ ɡɔ̃ˈɕɔrɨ] is a settlement in the administrative district of Gmina Janowiec Kościelny, within Nidzica County, Warmian-Masurian Voivodeship, in northern Poland.
