= Zachy =

- Village
- Location within Poland
- Coordinates: 53°13′11″N 20°14′35″E
- Country: Poland
- Voivodeship: Warmian-Masurian
- County: Nidzica
- Gmina: Janowo

Zachy [ˈzaxɨ] is a village in the administrative district of Gmina Janowo, within Nidzica County, Warmian-Masurian Voivodeship, in northern Poland.
