= Tatary, Nidzica County =

Tatary
- Village
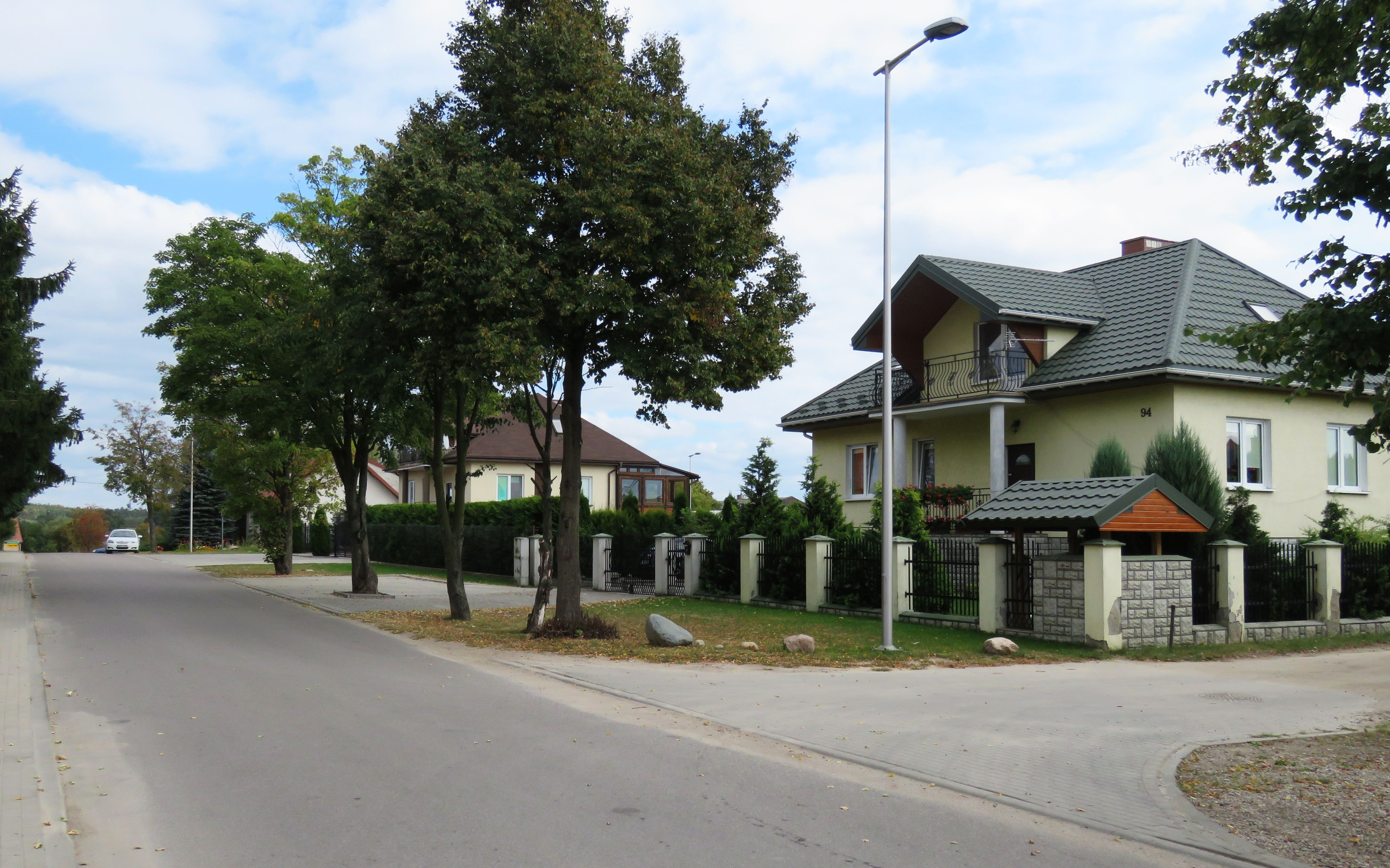

- Location within Poland
- Coordinates: 53°20′N 20°26′E
- Country: Poland
- Voivodeship: Warmian-Masurian
- County: Nidzica
- Gmina: Nidzica
- Time zone: UTC+1 (CET)
  - Summer (DST): UTC+2 (CEST)
- Vehicle registration: NNI

Tatary [taˈtarɨ] is a village in the administrative district of Gmina Nidzica, within Nidzica County, Warmian-Masurian Voivodeship, in northern Poland. It is located in Masuria.
