= Grabowo, Nidzica County =

Grabowo
- Village
- Location within Poland
- Coordinates: 53°20′N 20°35′E
- Country: Poland
- Voivodeship: Warmian-Masurian
- County: Nidzica
- Gmina: Janowo

Grabowo [ɡraˈbɔvɔ] is a village in the administrative district of Gmina Janowo, within Nidzica County, Warmian-Masurian Voivodeship, in northern Poland.
