= Robaczewo =

- Village
- Location within Poland
- Coordinates: 53°21′30″N 20°27′26″E
- Country: Poland
- Voivodeship: Warmian-Masurian
- County: Nidzica
- Gmina: Nidzica

Robaczewo [rɔbaˈt͡ʂɛvɔ] is a village in the administrative district of Gmina Nidzica, within Nidzica County, Warmian-Masurian Voivodeship, in northern Poland.
