= Zdrojek, Nidzica County =

Zdrojek
- Settlement
- Location within Poland
- Coordinates: 53°12′35″N 19°56′49″E
- Country: Poland
- Voivodeship: Warmian-Masurian
- County: Nidzica
- Gmina: Janowo

Zdrojek [ˈzdrɔjɛk] is a settlement in the administrative district of Gmina Janowo, within Nidzica County, Warmian-Masurian Voivodeship, in northern Poland.
