= Żelazno, Warmian-Masurian Voivodeship =

Żelazno
- Village
- Location within Poland
- Coordinates: 53°28′30″N 20°23′34″E
- Country: Poland
- Voivodeship: Warmian-Masurian
- County: Nidzica
- Gmina: Nidzica
- Population: 217

Żelazno [ʐɛˈlaznɔ] is a village in the administrative district of Gmina Nidzica, within Nidzica County, Warmian-Masurian Voivodeship, in northern Poland.
