= Napierki =

- Village
- Location within Poland
- Coordinates: 53°14′N 20°26′E
- Country: Poland
- Voivodeship: Warmian-Masurian
- County: Nidzica
- Gmina: Janowiec Kościelny
- Population: 190

Napierki ([naˈpjɛrki]; German: Napierken, 1938–45 Wetzhausen) is a village in the administrative district of Gmina Janowiec Kościelny, within Nidzica County, Warmian-Masurian Voivodeship, in northern Poland.
