= Borowy Młyn, Warmian-Masurian Voivodeship =

Borowy Młyn
- Settlement
- Location within Poland
- Coordinates: 53°16′29″N 20°23′09″E
- Country: Poland
- Voivodeship: Warmian-Masurian
- County: Nidzica
- Gmina: Nidzica

Borowy Młyn [bɔˈrɔvɨ ˈmwɨn] is a settlement in the administrative district of Gmina Nidzica, within Nidzica County, Warmian-Masurian Voivodeship, in northern Poland.
