= Zabłocie Kanigowskie =

- Village
- Location within Poland
- Coordinates: 53°19′N 20°29′E
- Country: Poland
- Voivodeship: Warmian-Masurian
- County: Nidzica
- Gmina: Janowiec Kościelny
- Population: 40

Zabłocie Kanigowskie ([zaˈbwɔt͡ɕɛ kaniˈɡɔfskʲɛ]; German: Sablotschen, 1938–45 Winrichsrode) is a village in the administrative district of Gmina Janowiec Kościelny, within Nidzica County, Warmian-Masurian Voivodeship, in northern Poland.
