= Łyński Młyn =

- Settlement
- Location within Poland
- Coordinates: 53°26′37″N 20°25′18″E
- Country: Poland
- Voivodeship: Warmian-Masurian
- County: Nidzica
- Gmina: Nidzica

Łyński Młyn [ˈwɨɲski ˈmwɨn] is a settlement in the administrative district of Gmina Nidzica, within Nidzica County, Warmian-Masurian Voivodeship, in northern Poland.
