= Jastrząbki =

- Village
- Location within Poland
- Coordinates: 53°18′29″N 20°30′37″E
- Country: Poland
- Voivodeship: Warmian-Masurian
- County: Nidzica
- Gmina: Janowiec Kościelny
- Population: 50

Jastrząbki [jasˈtʂɔmpki] is a village in the administrative district of Gmina Janowiec Kościelny, within Nidzica County, Warmian-Masurian Voivodeship, in northern Poland.
