= Jabłonowo-Adamy =

- Village
- Location within Poland
- Coordinates: 53°14′23″N 20°29′30″E
- Country: Poland
- Voivodeship: Warmian-Masurian
- County: Nidzica
- Gmina: Janowiec Kościelny

Jabłonowo-Adamy [jabwɔˈnɔvɔ aˈdamɨ] is a village in the administrative district of Gmina Janowiec Kościelny, within Nidzica County, Warmian-Masurian Voivodeship, in northern Poland.
