= Janowiec-Zdzięty =

- Settlement
- Location within Poland
- Coordinates: 53°18′08″N 20°30′24″E
- Country: Poland
- Voivodeship: Warmian-Masurian
- County: Nidzica
- Gmina: Janowiec Kościelny

Janowiec-Zdzięty [jaˈnɔvjɛt͡s ˈzd͡ʑɛntɨ] is a settlement in the administrative district of Gmina Janowiec Kościelny, within Nidzica County, Warmian-Masurian Voivodeship, in northern Poland.
