= Szczepkowo-Sołdany =

- Settlement
- Location within Poland
- Coordinates: 53°16′29″N 20°34′18″E
- Country: Poland
- Voivodeship: Warmian-Masurian
- County: Nidzica
- Gmina: Janowiec Kościelny

Szczepkowo-Sołdany [ʂt͡ʂɛpˈkɔvɔ sɔu̯ˈdanɨ] is a settlement in the administrative district of Gmina Janowiec Kościelny, within Nidzica County, Warmian-Masurian Voivodeship, in northern Poland.
