= Uścianek, Warmian-Masurian Voivodeship =

Uścianek
- Settlement
- Location within Poland
- Coordinates: 53°25′14″N 20°41′03″E
- Country: Poland
- Voivodeship: Warmian-Masurian
- County: Nidzica
- Gmina: Janowo

Uścianek [uɕˈt͡ɕanɛk] is a settlement in the administrative district of Gmina Janowo, within Nidzica County, Warmian-Masurian Voivodeship, in northern Poland.
