= Bujaki, Warmian-Masurian Voivodeship =

Bujaki
- Village
- Location within Poland
- Coordinates: 53°27′35″N 20°22′11″E
- Country: Poland
- Voivodeship: Warmian-Masurian
- County: Nidzica
- Gmina: Nidzica
- Population: 40

Bujaki [buˈjaki] is a village in the administrative district of Gmina Nidzica, within Nidzica County, Warmian-Masurian Voivodeship, in northern Poland.
