= Gertrud Dorka =

German archaeologist and prehistorian

- Born: 19 March 1893; Orlau, Germany
- Died: 14 February 1976 (aged 82); Berlin, Germany

Gertrud Dorka (19 March 1893 – 14 February 1976) was a German archaeologist, prehistorian, museum director and teacher. She was the museum director of the State Museum for Prehistory and Early History between 1947 and 1958.

== Early life and education ==
Dorka was born on 19 March 1893 in Orlau in Germany (now Orłowo in Poland). Her father was a teacher. She qualified to be a teacher in 1914 however the family fled to Berlin at the outbreak of World War I. She then taught in various schools in Pankow, a borough of Berlin.

She became a guest student at the University of Berlin, where she studied anthropology, history, prehistory and geology. In 1918, she began studying under Albert Kiekebusch at the Märkisches Museum and participated in excavations.

She studied anthropology, geography and prehistory at the University of Berlin and the University of Kiel between 1930 and 1936. She completed her doctorate about the town of Pyrzyce in 1936 at the University of Kiel under Gustav Schwantes. After finishing her doctorate, she was offered a job in a museum in Kiel on the condition that she join the Nazi Party but she refused and she began working as a teacher again instead.

== Career ==
Dorka was evacuated to Zeitz with her school classes at the start of World War II. She returned to Berlin in 1946 and resumed working as a teacher.

In late 1946, Berlin city council decided to merge the cities museums because of financial reasons. Dorka became the museum director of the State Museum for Prehistory and Early History on 1 September 1947. Not long after, she began searching through the rubble of museums destroyed by air raids for artefacts. She also managed to secure several items from the Märkisches Museum collection and repatriated museum property which had been relocated to an estate in Lebus during the war. The building had been destroyed and looted by both the Red Army and by locals. In a bid to retrieve stolen items, Dorka bribed the locals, especially the children, with sweets to barter with and managed to collect 280 boxes of artefacts including some related to Heinrich Schliemann. The museum officially opened in 1955. The museum was merged with the Prussian Cultural Heritage Foundation near the end of the 1950s.

During the 1950s, Dorka led excavations in Berlin, which was still in the process of being rebuilt. These excavations took place in the districts of Britz, Mariendorf and Hermsdorf. Her most important excavation from this period was of the 6th century AD grave found in Britz on 28 March 1951. The grave included the bones of a two young women as well as iron tools, bronze buckles, a bone comb, a glass bowl and a gold coin. She retired as museum director on 31 March 1958.

After her retirement, Dorka published a book on archaeological discoveries in Neukölln, a borough of Berlin.

She was awarded the Order of Merit of the Federal Republic of Germany in 1973.

She died in Berlin on 14 February 1976. In November 1996, a street, Gertrud-Dorka-Weg, in Berlin was named after her.
