= Rozdroże =

- Village
- Location within Poland
- Coordinates: 53°21′19″N 20°21′20″E
- Country: Poland
- Voivodeship: Warmian-Masurian
- County: Nidzica
- Gmina: Nidzica
- Population: 452

Rozdroże [rɔzˈdrɔʐɛ] is a village in the administrative district of Gmina Nidzica, within Nidzica County, Warmian-Masurian Voivodeship, in northern Poland.
