= Zaborowo, Gmina Janowiec Kościelny =

Zaborowo
- Village
- Location within Poland
- Coordinates: 53°15′N 20°36′E
- Country: Poland
- Voivodeship: Warmian-Masurian
- County: Nidzica
- Gmina: Janowiec Kościelny
- Population: 160

Zaborowo [zabɔˈrɔvɔ] is a village in the administrative district of Gmina Janowiec Kościelny, within Nidzica County, Warmian-Masurian Voivodeship, in northern Poland.
