= Leśne Pólko =

- Settlement
- Location within Poland
- Coordinates: 53°28′24″N 20°31′22″E
- Country: Poland
- Voivodeship: Warmian-Masurian
- County: Nidzica
- Gmina: Nidzica

Leśne Pólko [ˈlɛɕnɛ ˈpulkɔ] is a settlement in the administrative district of Gmina Nidzica within Nidzica County, Warmian-Masurian Voivodeship, in northern Poland.
