= Maxin =

Maxin may refer to:

- Ernest Maxin (1923–2018), British television producer and director
- Fritz Maxin (1885–1960), German politician and lay preacher
- A trade name for a kind of jet nebulizer
