= Janowiec-Leśniki =

- Village
- Location within Poland
- Coordinates: 53°17′04″N 20°29′51″E
- Country: Poland
- Voivodeship: Warmian-Masurian
- County: Nidzica
- Gmina: Janowiec Kościelny

Janowiec-Leśniki [jaˈnɔvjɛt͡s lɛɕˈniki] is a village in the administrative district of Gmina Janowiec Kościelny, within Nidzica County, Warmian-Masurian Voivodeship, in northern Poland.
