= Szczepkowo-Zalesie =

- Village
- Location within Poland
- Coordinates: 53°17′N 20°37′E
- Country: Poland
- Voivodeship: Warmian-Masurian
- County: Nidzica
- Gmina: Janowiec Kościelny
- Population: 60

Szczepkowo-Zalesie [ʂt͡ʂɛpˈkɔvɔ zaˈlɛɕɛ] is a village in the administrative district of Gmina Janowiec Kościelny, within Nidzica County, Warmian-Masurian Voivodeship, in northern Poland.
