= Łysakowo, Warmian-Masurian Voivodeship =

Łysakowo
- Village
- Location within Poland
- Coordinates: 53°22′N 20°19′E
- Country: Poland
- Voivodeship: Warmian-Masurian
- County: Nidzica
- Gmina: Nidzica

Łysakowo [wɨsaˈkɔvɔ] is a village in the administrative district of Gmina Nidzica, within Nidzica County, Warmian-Masurian Voivodeship, in northern Poland.
