= Komorowo, Nidzica County =

Komorowo
- Village
- Location within Poland
- Coordinates: 53°19′20″N 20°40′0″E
- Country: Poland
- Voivodeship: Warmian-Masurian
- County: Nidzica
- Gmina: Janowo
- Population: 250
- Time zone: UTC+1 (CET)
  - Summer (DST): UTC+2 (CEST)
- Vehicle registration: NNI

Komorowo [kɔmɔˈrɔvɔ] is a village in the administrative district of Gmina Janowo, within the Nidzica County, Warmian-Masurian Voivodeship, in northern Poland. It is located in Masuria.

Komorowo borders the village of Janowo by the Orzyc River.

== History ==
In 1454, King Casimir IV Jagiellon incorporated the region to the Kingdom of Poland upon the request of the anti-Teutonic Prussian Confederation. After the subsequent Thirteen Years' War (1454–1466), it became a part of Poland as a fief held by the Teutonic Knights. The village was founded by Polish people. In 1544, Cherubin Kosmaczewski was granted 46 włókas of land in Komorowo. As of 1600, the population was solely Polish.

From the 18th century it was part of the Kingdom of Prussia, and from 1871 it was part of Germany, within which it formed part of the province of East Prussia. It was a border village located on the border with the Russian Partition of Poland. Two annual fairs were held in the village in the late 19th century. In 1938, during a massive campaign of renaming of placenames, the Nazi government of Germany renamed the village to Großmuckenhausen in attempt to erase traces of Polish origin. After Germany's defeat in World War II, in 1945, the village became again part of Poland and its historic Polish name was restored.
