= Wólka Orłowska, Warmian-Masurian Voivodeship =

Wólka Orłowska
- Village
- Location within Poland
- Coordinates: 53°29′N 20°27′E
- Country: Poland
- Voivodeship: Warmian-Masurian
- County: Nidzica
- Gmina: Nidzica

Wólka Orłowska [ˈvulka ɔrˈwɔfska] is a village in the administrative district of Gmina Nidzica, within Nidzica County, Warmian-Masurian Voivodeship, in northern Poland.
