= Grzegórzki =

Grzegórzki may refer to the following places in Poland:

- Grzegórzki, Kraków
- Grzegórzki, Warmian-Masurian Voivodeship
