= Leparsky =

Leparsky (masculine, Russian: Лепарский) or Leparskaya (feminine, Russian: Лепарская) is a Russian surname. Notable people with the surname include:

- Feliks Leparsky (1875–1917), Russian fencer
- Irina Leparskaya (born 1957), Soviet rhythmic gymnastics coach
