= Janowiec Szlachecki =

- Settlement
- Location within Poland
- Coordinates: 53°18′N 20°31′E
- Country: Poland
- Voivodeship: Warmian-Masurian
- County: Nidzica
- Gmina: Janowiec Kościelny

Janowiec Szlachecki (Polish pronunciation: [jaˈnɔvjɛts ʂlaˈxɛtskʲi]) is a settlement in the administrative district of Gmina Janowiec Kościelny, within Nidzica County, Warmian-Masurian Voivodeship, in northern Poland.
