= Jabłonowo-Dyby =

- Village
- Location within Poland
- Coordinates: 53°15′10″N 20°29′45″E
- Country: Poland
- Voivodeship: Warmian-Masurian
- County: Nidzica
- Gmina: Janowiec Kościelny

Jabłonowo-Dyby [jabwɔˈnɔvɔ ˈdɨbɨ] is a village in the administrative district of Gmina Janowiec Kościelny, within Nidzica County, Warmian-Masurian Voivodeship, in northern Poland.
