= Piątki, Warmian-Masurian Voivodeship =

Piątki
- Village
- Location within Poland
- Coordinates: 53°21′N 20°25′E
- Country: Poland
- Voivodeship: Warmian-Masurian
- County: Nidzica
- Gmina: Nidzica
- Time zone: UTC+1 (CET)
  - Summer (DST): UTC+2 (CEST)
- Postal code: 13-100
- Vehicle registration: NNI

Piątki [ˈpjɔntki] is a village in the administrative district of Gmina Nidzica, within Nidzica County, Warmian-Masurian Voivodeship, in northern Poland. It is located in Masuria.

The existence of the village is attested in 1412, when Mikołaj (Nicholas) of Piątki was mentioned.
