= Zbyluty =

- Settlement
- Location within Poland
- Coordinates: 53°17′N 20°27′E
- Country: Poland
- Voivodeship: Warmian-Masurian
- County: Nidzica
- Gmina: Janowiec Kościelny

Zbyluty ([zbɨˈlutɨ]; German: Sbylutten, 1938–45 Billau) is a settlement in the administrative district of Gmina Janowiec Kościelny, within Nidzica County, Warmian-Masurian Voivodeship, in northern Poland.
