= Grabówko, Warmian-Masurian Voivodeship =

Grabówko
- Village
- Location within Poland
- Coordinates: 53°21′11″N 20°36′59″E
- Country: Poland
- Voivodeship: Warmian-Masurian
- County: Nidzica
- Gmina: Janowo
- Population: 40

Grabówko [ɡraˈbufkɔ] is a village in the administrative district of Gmina Janowo, within Nidzica County, Warmian-Masurian Voivodeship, in northern Poland.
