= Zembrzus-Mokry Grunt =

- Village
- Location within Poland
- Coordinates: 53°16′45″N 20°38′44″E
- Country: Poland
- Voivodeship: Warmian-Masurian
- County: Nidzica
- Gmina: Janowo
- Population: 170

Zembrzus-Mokry Grunt [ˈzɛmbʐus ˈmɔkrɨ ˈɡrunt] is a village in the administrative district of Gmina Janowo, within Nidzica County, Warmian-Masurian Voivodeship, in northern Poland.
