= Lomno =

Lomno may refer to:

- Łomno, Warmian-Masurian Voivodeship, a village in Nidzica County in northern Poland
- Łomno, Świętokrzyskie Voivodeship, a village in the Starachowice County in southeastern Poland
- Lomno, Slovenia, a settlement in the Krško municipality in Slovenia
- Lomná (river), a river of the Czech Republic
