= Róg, Warmian-Masurian Voivodeship =

Róg
- Village
- Location within Poland
- Coordinates: 53°21′N 20°45′E
- Country: Poland
- Voivodeship: Warmian-Masurian
- County: Nidzica
- Gmina: Janowo
- Population: 440

Róg [ruk] is a village in the administrative district of Gmina Janowo, within Nidzica County, Warmian-Masurian Voivodeship, in northern Poland.
