= Brzeżno Łyńskie =

- Village
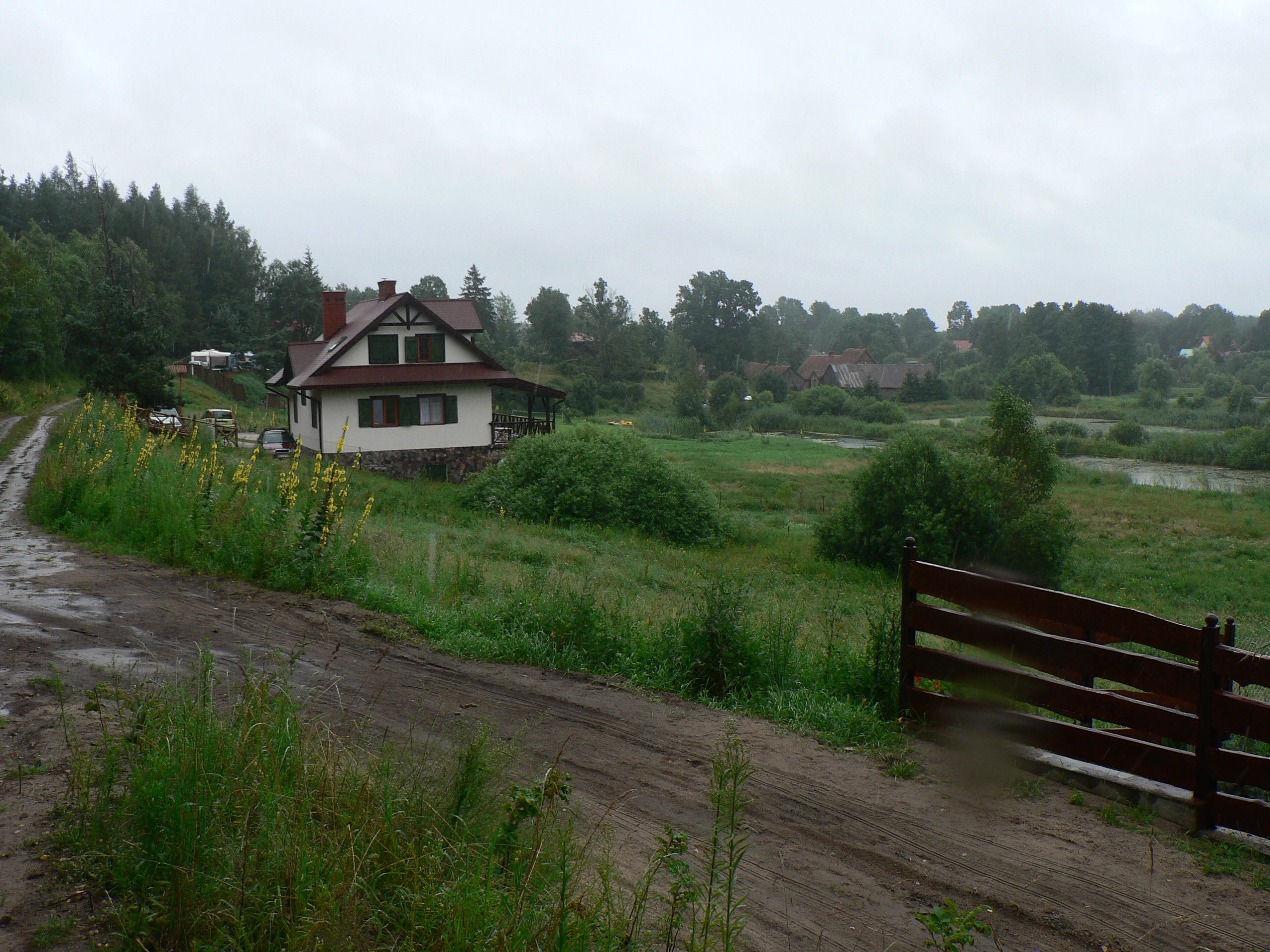

- Location within Poland
- Coordinates: 53°30′33″N 20°29′1″E
- Country: Poland
- Voivodeship: Warmian-Masurian
- County: Nidzica
- Gmina: Nidzica

Brzeżno Łyńskie [ˈbʐɛʐnɔ ˈwɨɲskʲɛ] is a village in the administrative district of Gmina Nidzica, within Nidzica County, Warmian-Masurian Voivodeship, in northern Poland.
