= Olszewo, Nidzica County =

Olszewo
- Village
- Location within Poland
- Coordinates: 53°21′N 20°23′E
- Country: Poland
- Voivodeship: Warmian-Masurian
- County: Nidzica
- Gmina: Nidzica
- Time zone: UTC+1 (CET)
  - Summer (DST): UTC+2 (CEST)
- Vehicle registration: NNI

Olszewo [ɔlˈʂɛvɔ] is a village in the administrative district of Gmina Nidzica, within Nidzica County, Warmian-Masurian Voivodeship, in northern Poland. It is located in Masuria.

Since the 17th century, Olszewo was a possession of the Olszewski, Krokowski and Rakowski noble families.
