= Miecznikowo-Cygany =

- Village
- Location within Poland
- Coordinates: 53°15′36″N 20°30′00″E
- Country: Poland
- Voivodeship: Warmian-Masurian
- County: Nidzica
- Gmina: Janowiec Kościelny
- Population: 70

Miecznikowo-Cygany [mjɛt͡ʂniˈkɔvɔ t͡sɨˈɡanɨ] is a village in the administrative district of Gmina Janowiec Kościelny, within Nidzica County, Warmian-Masurian Voivodeship, in northern Poland.
