= Łomno, Warmian-Masurian Voivodeship =

Łomno
- Village
- Location within Poland
- Coordinates: 53°19′47″N 20°42′04″E
- Country: Poland
- Voivodeship: Warmian-Masurian
- County: Nidzica
- Gmina: Janowo

Łomno [ˈwɔmnɔ] is a village in the administrative district of Gmina Janowo, within Nidzica County, Warmian-Masurian Voivodeship, in northern Poland.
