= Janowo, Nidzica County =

Janowo
- Village
- Coat of arms

- Location within Poland
- Coordinates: 53°19′N 20°40′E
- Country: Poland
- Voivodeship: Warmian-Masurian
- County: Nidzica
- Gmina: Janowo
- Population: 1,000
- Time zone: UTC+1 (CET)
  - Summer (DST): UTC+2 (CEST)
- Vehicle registration: NNI

Janowo [jaˈnɔvɔ] (formerly known historically in Polish as Janów) is a former town, now a village in Nidzica County, Warmian-Masurian Voivodeship, in northern Poland. It is the seat of the gmina (administrative district) called Gmina Janowo.

Janowo borders the village of Komorowo by the Orzyc River.

== History ==
The village dates back to the Middle Ages. It was granted town rights in 1421 by Duke Janusz I of Warsaw from the Piast dynasty. It formed part of the Kingdom of Poland until the Second Partition of Poland in 1793, when it was annexed by Prussia. In 1807, it became part of the short-lived Polish Duchy of Warsaw, and after the duchy's dissolution in 1815, it was part of so-called Congress Poland in the Russian Partition of Poland. It was one of numerous Polish towns stripped of town rights in 1869, as punishment for the unsuccessful Polish January Uprising against Russia. During World War I, it was occupied by Germany. After the war, in 1918, Poland regained independence and control of the settlement. During World War II, it was occupied by Germany.

== Sports ==
The local football club is Orzyc Janowo. It competes in the lower leagues.
