= Gmina Janowo =

Gmina Janowo Janowo Commune
- Gmina
- Coat of arms
- Interactive map of Gmina Janowo
- Coordinates (Janowo): 53°19′N 20°40′E
- Country: Poland
- Voivodeship: Warmian-Masurian
- County: Nidzica
- Seat: Janowo

Area
  - Total: 191.56 km^{2} (73.96 sq mi)

Population (2006)
  - Total: 2,886
  - Density: 15.07/km^{2} (39.02/sq mi)
- Website: http://www.janowo.pl/

Gmina Janowo is a rural gmina (administrative district) in Nidzica County, Warmian-Masurian Voivodeship, in northern Poland. Its seat is the village of Janowo, which lies approximately 17 kilometres (11 mi) east of Nidzica and 53 km (33 mi) south of the regional capital Olsztyn.

The gmina covers an area of 191.56 square kilometres (74.0 sq mi), and as of 2006 its total population is 2,886.

== Villages ==
Gmina Janowo contains the villages and settlements of Grabówko, Grabowo, Jagarzewo, Janowo, Komorowo, Łomno, Muszaki, Puchałowo, Rembowo, Róg, Ruskowo, Ryki-Borkowo, Szczepkowo-Giewarty, Szemplino Czarne, Szemplino Wielkie, Ulesie, Uścianek, Wichrowiec, Więckowo, Zachy, Zawady, Zdrojek and Zembrzus-Mokry Grunt.

== Neighbouring gminas ==
Gmina Janowo is bordered by the gminas of Chorzele, Dzierzgowo, Janowiec Kościelny, Jedwabno, Nidzica and Wielbark.
