= Miecznikowo-Miąchy =

- Settlement
- Location within Poland
- Coordinates: 53°15′32″N 20°29′00″E
- Country: Poland
- Voivodeship: Warmian-Masurian
- County: Nidzica
- Gmina: Janowiec Kościelny
- Population: 3

Miecznikowo-Miąchy [mjɛt͡ʂniˈkɔvɔ ˈmjɔ̃xɨ] is a settlement in the administrative district of Gmina Janowiec Kościelny, within Nidzica County, Warmian-Masurian Voivodeship, in northern Poland.
