= Gmina Nidzica =

Gmina Nidzica Nidzica Commune
- Gmina
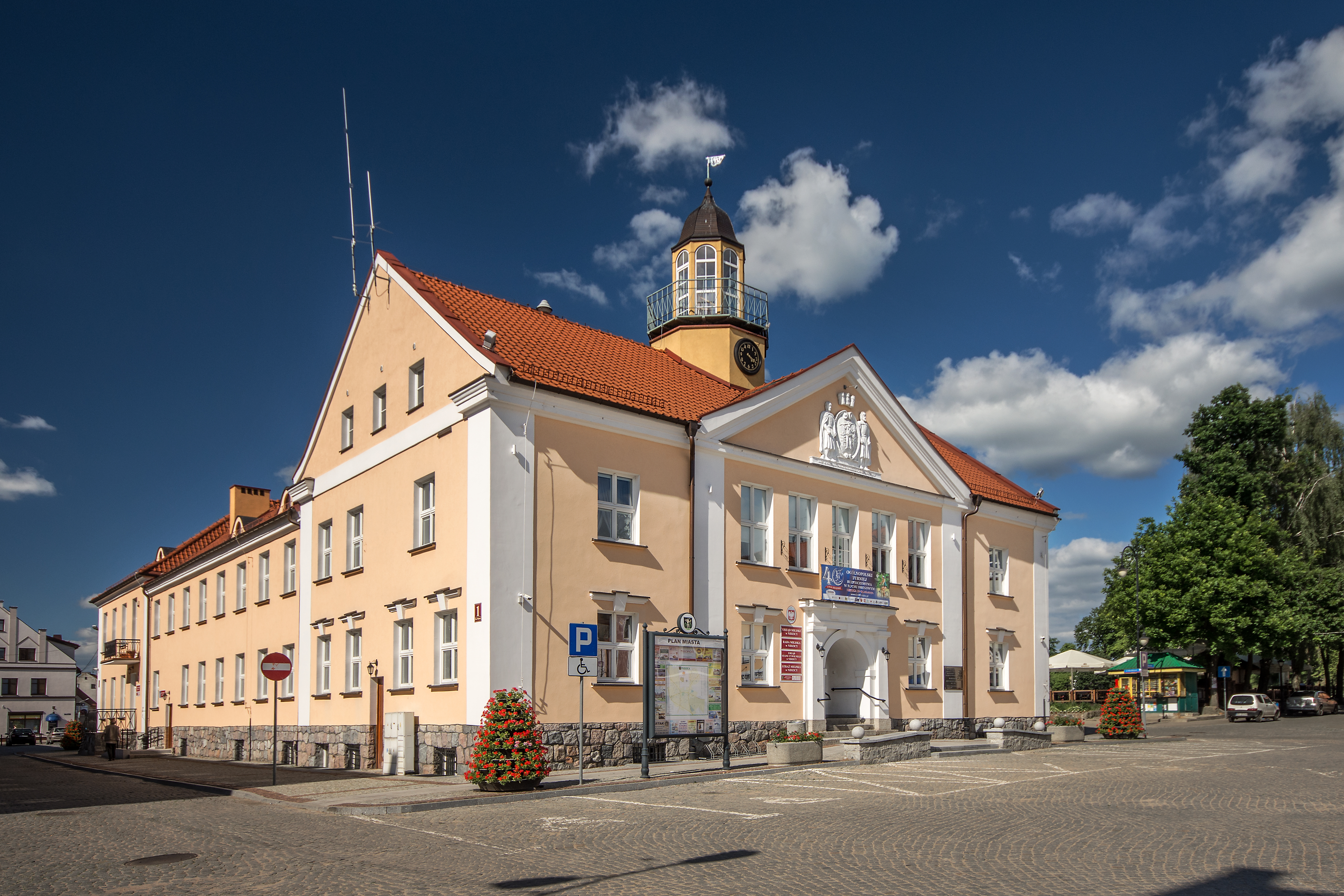
- Town Hall in Nidzica, seat of the gmina office

- Coat of arms
- Interactive map of Gmina Nidzica
- Coordinates (Nidzica): 53°21′30″N 20°25′30″E
- Country: Poland
- Voivodeship: Warmian-Masurian
- County: Nidzica
- Seat: Nidzica

Area
  - Total: 378.88 km^{2} (146.29 sq mi)

Population (2006)
  - Total: 21,485
  - Density: 56.707/km^{2} (146.87/sq mi)
  - Urban: 14,761
  - Rural: 6,724
- Time zone: UTC+1 (CET)
  - Summer (DST): UTC+2 (CEST)
- Vehicle registration: NNI
- Website: http://www.nidzica.pl

Gmina Nidzica is an urban-rural gmina (administrative district) in Nidzica County, Warmian-Masurian Voivodeship, in northern Poland. Its seat is the town of Nidzica, which lies approximately 48 kilometres (30 mi) south of the regional capital Olsztyn.

The gmina covers an area of 378.88 square kilometres (146.3 sq mi), and as of 2006 its total population is 21,485 (out of which the population of Nidzica amounts to 14,761, and the population of the rural part of the gmina is 6,724).

== Villages ==
Apart from the town of Nidzica, Gmina Nidzica contains the villages and settlements of Bartoszki, Bolejny, Borowy Młyn, Brzeżno Łyńskie, Bujaki, Dobrzyń, Frąknowo, Grzegórzki, Jabłonka, Kalkownia, Kamionka, Kanigowo, Koniuszyn, Łączki, Leśne Pólko, Leśne Śliwki, Likusy, Litwinki, Łyna, Łyński Młyn, Łysakowo, Magdaleniec, Moczysko, Módłki, Mogiłowo, Napiwoda, Natać Mała, Natać Wielka, Nibork Drugi, Olszewko, Olszewo, Orłowo, Parowa, Pawliki, Piątki, Piotrowice, Rączki, Radomin, Robaczewo, Rozdroże, Siemiątki, Szerokopaś, Tatary, Wały, Waszulki, Waszulki-Kolonia, Wietrzychówko, Wietrzychowo, Wikno, Wolisko, Wólka Orłowska, Zagrzewo, Załuski, Żelazno and Zimna Woda.

== Neighbouring gminas ==
Gmina Nidzica is bordered by the gminas of Janowiec Kościelny, Janowo, Jedwabno, Kozłowo and Olsztynek.
