= Waśniewo-Gwoździe =

- Village
- Location within Poland
- Coordinates: 53°15′11″N 20°32′53″E
- Country: Poland
- Voivodeship: Warmian-Masurian
- County: Nidzica
- Gmina: Janowiec Kościelny
- Population: 170

Waśniewo-Gwoździe [vaɕˈɲɛvɔ ˈɡvɔʑd͡ʑɛ] is a village in the administrative district of Gmina Janowiec Kościelny, within Nidzica County, Warmian-Masurian Voivodeship, in northern Poland.
