= Grzegórzki, Warmian-Masurian Voivodeship =

Grzegórzki
- Village
- Location within Poland
- Coordinates: 53°22′N 20°31′E
- Country: Poland
- Voivodeship: Warmian-Masurian
- County: Nidzica
- Gmina: Nidzica

Grzegórzki [ɡʐɛˈɡuʂki] is a village in the administrative district of Gmina Nidzica, within Nidzica County, Warmian-Masurian Voivodeship, in northern Poland.
