= Feliks Leparsky =

Russian fencer

Personal information
- Born: 1875
- Died: 10 August 1914 (aged 38–39) Orlau, Germany

Sport
- Sport: Fencing

Feliks Leparsky (Russian: Феликс Зенович Лепарский, 1875 – 10 August 1914, Orlau, Germany) was a Russian fencer. He competed in the individual foil event at the 1912 Summer Olympics. He served as a captain in the Russian army and was killed during World War I.

== See also ==
- List of Olympians killed in World War I
