= Miecznikowo-Gołębie =

- Village
- Location within Poland
- Coordinates: 53°15′47″N 20°28′35″E
- Country: Poland
- Voivodeship: Warmian-Masurian
- County: Nidzica
- Gmina: Janowiec Kościelny
- Population: 40

Miecznikowo-Gołębie [mjɛt͡ʂniˈkɔvɔ ɡɔˈwɛmbjɛ] is a village in the administrative district of Gmina Janowiec Kościelny, within Nidzica County, Warmian-Masurian Voivodeship, in northern Poland.
