= Janowiec Kościelny =

- Village
- Location within Poland
- Coordinates: 53°17′25″N 20°31′22″E
- Country: Poland
- Voivodeship: Warmian-Masurian
- County: Nidzica
- Gmina: Janowiec Kościelny
- Population: 360

Janowiec Kościelny [jaˈnɔvjɛt͡s kɔɕˈt͡ɕɛlnɨ] is a village in Nidzica County, Warmian-Masurian Voivodeship, in northern Poland. It is the seat of the gmina (administrative district) called Gmina Janowiec Kościelny.
