= Napiwoda =

- Village
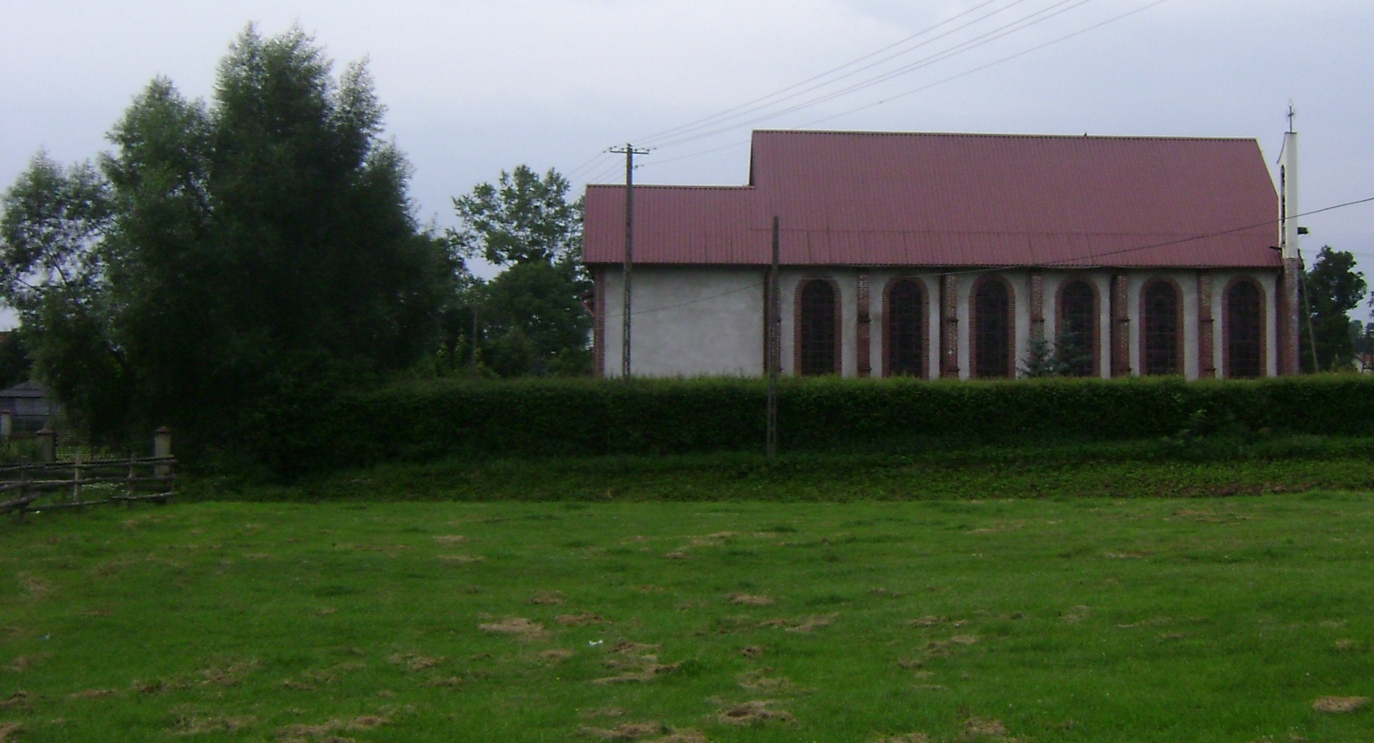

- Location within Poland
- Coordinates: 53°24′N 20°29′E
- Country: Poland
- Voivodeship: Warmian-Masurian
- County: Nidzica
- Gmina: Nidzica
- Population: 792

Napiwoda [napiˈvɔda] is a village in the administrative district of Gmina Nidzica, within Nidzica County, Warmian-Masurian Voivodeship, in northern Poland.

== Notable residents ==
- Adolf Weitkunat (1895–1988), Wehrmacht general
