= Miecznikowo-Sowy =

- Settlement
- Location within Poland
- Coordinates: 53°09′17″N 20°18′08″E
- Country: Poland
- Voivodeship: Warmian-Masurian
- County: Nidzica
- Gmina: Janowiec Kościelny

Miecznikowo-Sowy [mjɛt͡ʂniˈkɔvɔ ˈsɔvɨ] is a settlement in the administrative district of Gmina Janowiec Kościelny, within Nidzica County, Warmian-Masurian Voivodeship, in northern Poland.
