= Kanigowo, Warmian-Masurian Voivodeship =

Kanigowo
- Village
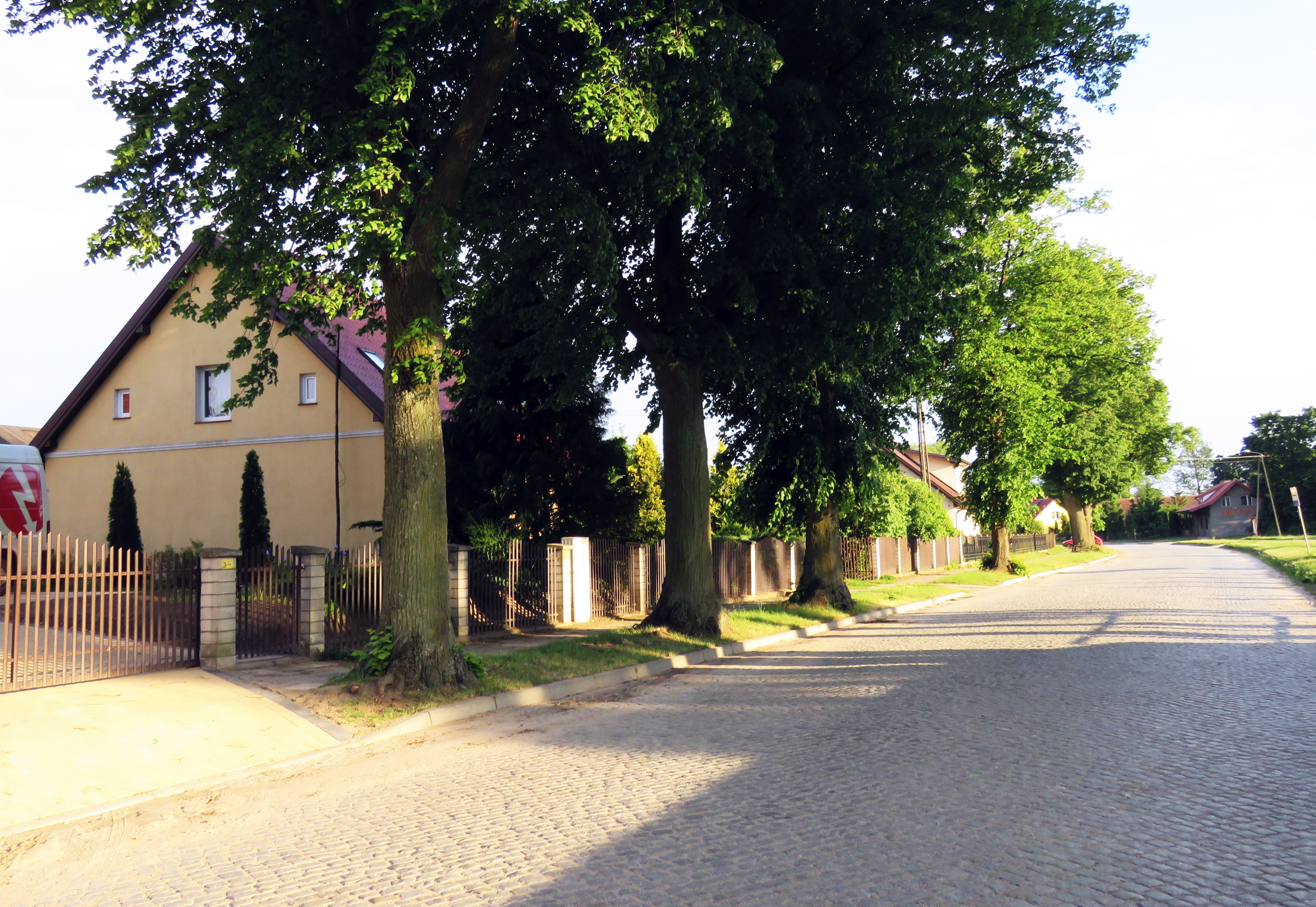

- Location within Poland
- Coordinates: 53°19′N 20°26′E
- Country: Poland
- Voivodeship: Warmian-Masurian
- County: Nidzica
- Gmina: Nidzica
- Time zone: UTC+1 (CET)
  - Summer (DST): UTC+2 (CEST)
- Vehicle registration: NNI

Kanigowo [kaniˈɡɔvɔ] is a village in the administrative district of Gmina Nidzica, within Nidzica County, Warmian-Masurian Voivodeship, in northern Poland.
