= Nangar Khel incident =

Massacre of Afghan civilians by Polish soldiers

- Location: Nangar Khel, Paktika Province, Afghanistan
- Date: August 16, 2007
- Attack type: Mortar strike
- Deaths: 6
- Injuries: 3
- Victim: Afghan civilians
- Perpetrator: Polish soldiers

The Nangar Khel incident, sometimes called the Nangar Khel massacre, took place in the Afghan village of Nangar Khel (Paktika Province) on August 16, 2007. A few hours after an insurgent IED ambush which damaged Polish wheeled armored vehicle (KTO Rosomak), a patrol of Polish soldiers from the elite 18th Airborne-Assault Battalion taking part in the International Security Assistance Force opened heavy machine gun and 60 mm mortar fire at the area of the village. The attack resulted in the deaths of 6 civilians, including a pregnant woman and 3 children, and seriously injured 3 other women.

Seven soldiers were court-martialed over the incident, but all of them were acquitted.

== Incident ==
According to the military report D9 161030z of the Afghan War Diary, the patrol fired 26 mortar rounds, of which 3 landed in a compound where a wedding celebration was taking place. The villagers stated that there was no shooting coming from the village when the mortars were fired there, while the Polish soldiers stated that they had fired a machine gun at four people near the village, who in turn fired back. The villagers stated that the Polish soldiers should have come to the village to ask for information regarding Taliban fighters planting of IEDs, since the villagers were opposed to Talibs' operations near their village.

That evening and the following day, the Provincial Reconstruction Team and Polish soldiers planned "consequence management", including contact with the villagers, gifts of food and supplies, the purchase of a goat for the villagers as a goodwill gesture, and regular visits to the village in order to build "trust and rapport with the villagers". Families of the victims were later paid compensation, while the injured Afghans were flown to be treated for their wounds in a hospital in Poland.

In result of the action eight innocent civilians including a pregnant women and children were killed. Aleksander Szczyglo - Defense Minister in 2008 - tried to avoid giving an answer to a journalist when he was asked about incident and called accused soldiers a "group of idiots who shot at civilians."

== Trial ==
On July 6, 2008, prosecutors ended the investigation and sent an indictment against seven soldiers of the Charlie combat team (2 officers, 2 non-commissioned officers and 3 privates) to Warsaw's Military District Court, accusing them of committing a war crime of unlawfully targeting civilians in a reprisal. Captain Olgierd C. and his men all said they were innocent. 6 of them (accused of killing civilians), if found guilty, would face a penalty of 12 to 25 years in prison to even life imprisonment, while another one (accused of opening fire on an unarmed target) faced up to 25 years in prison. According to a spokesperson for the Court, "It's a unique trial, not only in Poland but also in Europe or even in the world." Nevertheless, the case was given little attention in foreign media.

The trial began in February 2009. In May, Polish Minister of Defense Bogdan Klich gave testimony in which he called the incident "a mistake", citing the opinion of the commander of the U.S. forces in the area. The soldiers have also gained support from many military officers and celebrities, including General Sławomir Petelicki, the founder and first commander of the Polish special forces unit GROM. On June 1, 2011, the Warsaw District Court acquitted all seven soldiers for lack of evidence of deliberate killing. The court described the case as unprecedented in the history of the Polish military and judiciary. The prosecution has the right of appeal against the verdict.

== Re-trial ==
Poland's highest court opened a new trial for seven Polish soldiers in 2012. Prosecutors said that they are convinced that war crimes were committed. The first ruling "should not stand," prosecutor Jan Zak said. The case resulted in the acquittal of Captain O. C., the highest of rank among the defendants who issued the original military order. The Supreme Court also upheld the acquittals of two privates involved in the incident.

The case of remaining four soldiers was reopened by the Warsaw Military District Court. In 2015, the Court acquitted four Polish soldiers of the charges of war crimes. The ruling was appealed both by the defense and the prosecution and the case of remaining soldiers was to be reexamined by the Supreme Court of Poland.

The cases of ppor. (lower OF-1 Nato code rank) Bywalec, chor. (OR-8 Nato code) Andrzej Osiecki, plut. rezerwy (OR-4 higher, but reserve status - "rezerwy") Tomasz Borysiewicz and Ligocki, were sent to be examined by the Supreme Court, because there were doubts about their "innocent" status. Re-trial ended on March 19, 2015.

In February 2016 the Military Chamber of the Supreme Court in Warsaw (Poland) stated that the remaining 3 soldiers did not commit a war crime, but were found to have negligently carried out orders, which is an offence under Polish law. The ruling upheld the decision of a military court from March 2015. 3 Polish soldiers were given suspended jail sentences, while the case of one was conditionally discontinued.
