= Parowa, Nidzica County =

Parowa
- Settlement
- Location within Poland
- Coordinates: 53°22′24″N 20°33′21″E
- Country: Poland
- Voivodeship: Warmian-Masurian
- County: Nidzica
- Gmina: Nidzica

Parowa [paˈrɔva] is a settlement in the administrative district of Gmina Nidzica, within Nidzica County, Warmian-Masurian Voivodeship, in northern Poland.
