= Gmina Janowiec Kościelny =

Gmina Janowiec Kościelny Janowiec Kościelny Commune
- Gmina
- Interactive map of Gmina Janowiec Kościelny
- Coordinates (Janowiec Kościelny): 53°17′25″N 20°31′22″E
- Country: Poland
- Voivodeship: Warmian-Masurian
- County: Nidzica
- Seat: Janowiec Kościelny

Area
  - Total: 136.25 km^{2} (52.61 sq mi)

Population (2006)
  - Total: 3,443
  - Density: 25.27/km^{2} (65.45/sq mi)
- Website: http://www.janowiec.com.pl/index.php

Gmina Janowiec Kościelny is a rural gmina (administrative district) in Nidzica County, Warmian-Masurian Voivodeship, in northern Poland. Its seat is the village of Janowiec Kościelny, which lies approximately 10 kilometres (6 mi) south-east of Nidzica and 55 km (34 mi) south of the regional capital Olsztyn.

The gmina covers an area of 136.25 square kilometres (52.6 sq mi), and as of 2006 its total population is 3,443.

== Villages ==
Gmina Janowiec Kościelny contains the villages and settlements of Bielawy, Bukowiec Wielki, Gniadki, Górowo-Trząski, Grabowo Leśne, Jabłonowo-Adamy, Jabłonowo-Dyby, Jabłonowo-Maćkowięta, Janowiec Kościelny, Janowiec Szlachecki, Janowiec-Leśniki, Janowiec-Zdzięty, Jastrząbki, Kownatki-Falęcino, Krajewo Małe, Krajewo-Kawęczyno, Krusze, Kuce, Leśniewo Wielkie, Miecznikowo-Cygany, Miecznikowo-Gołębie, Miecznikowo-Kołaki, Miecznikowo-Miąchy, Miecznikowo-Siwe, Miecznikowo-Sowy, Młode Połcie, Napierki, Nowa Wieś Dmochy, Nowa Wieś Wielka, Piotrkowo, Pokrzywnica Wielka, Powierz, Safronka, Skrody, Smolany-Żardawy, Sołdany Wielkie, Sowy, Stare Połcie, Szczepkowo-Borowe, Szczepkowo-Iwany, Szczepkowo-Kukiełki, Szczepkowo-Pawełki, Szczepkowo-Sołdany, Szczepkowo-Zalesie, Szypułki-Zaskórki, Waśniewo-Grabowo, Waśniewo-Gwoździe, Wiłunie, Żabino-Arguły, Żabino-Gąsiory, Zabłocie Kanigowskie, Zaborowo and Zbyluty.

== Neighbouring gminas ==
Gmina Janowiec Kościelny is bordered by the gminas of Dzierzgowo, Iłowo-Osada, Janowo, Kozłowo, Nidzica and Wieczfnia Kościelna.
