= Jabłonka, Nidzica County =

Jabłonka
- Village
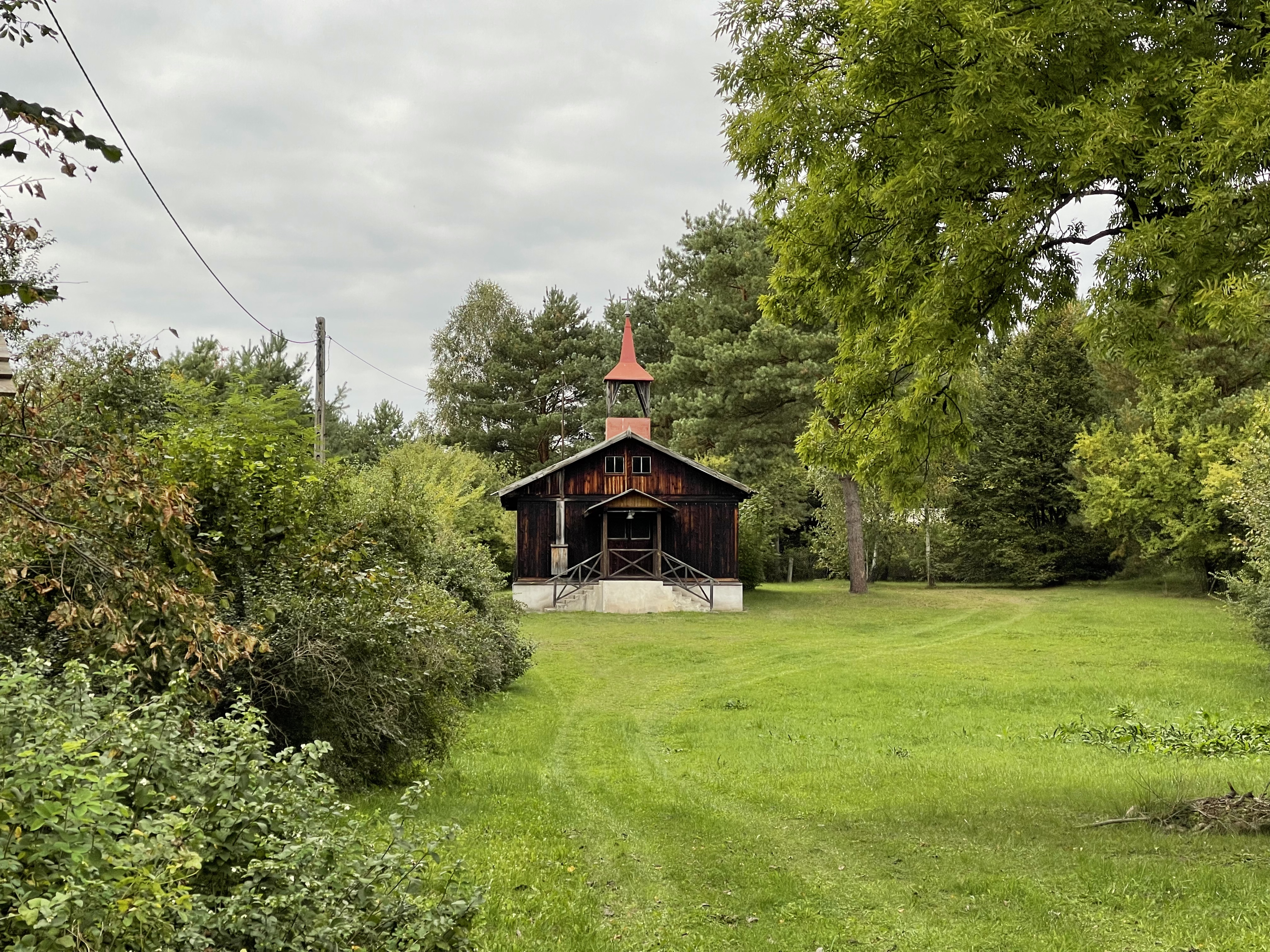
- Church in Jabłonka

- Location within Poland
- Coordinates: 53°30′N 20°34′E
- Country: Poland
- Voivodeship: Warmian-Masurian
- County: Nidzica
- Gmina: Nidzica

Population
  - Total: 780
- Time zone: UTC+1 (CET)
  - Summer (DST): UTC+2 (CEST)
- Vehicle registration: NNI

Jabłonka [jaˈbwɔnka] is a village in the administrative district of Gmina Nidzica, within Nidzica County, Warmian-Masurian Voivodeship, in northern Poland.
