= Muszaki =

- Village
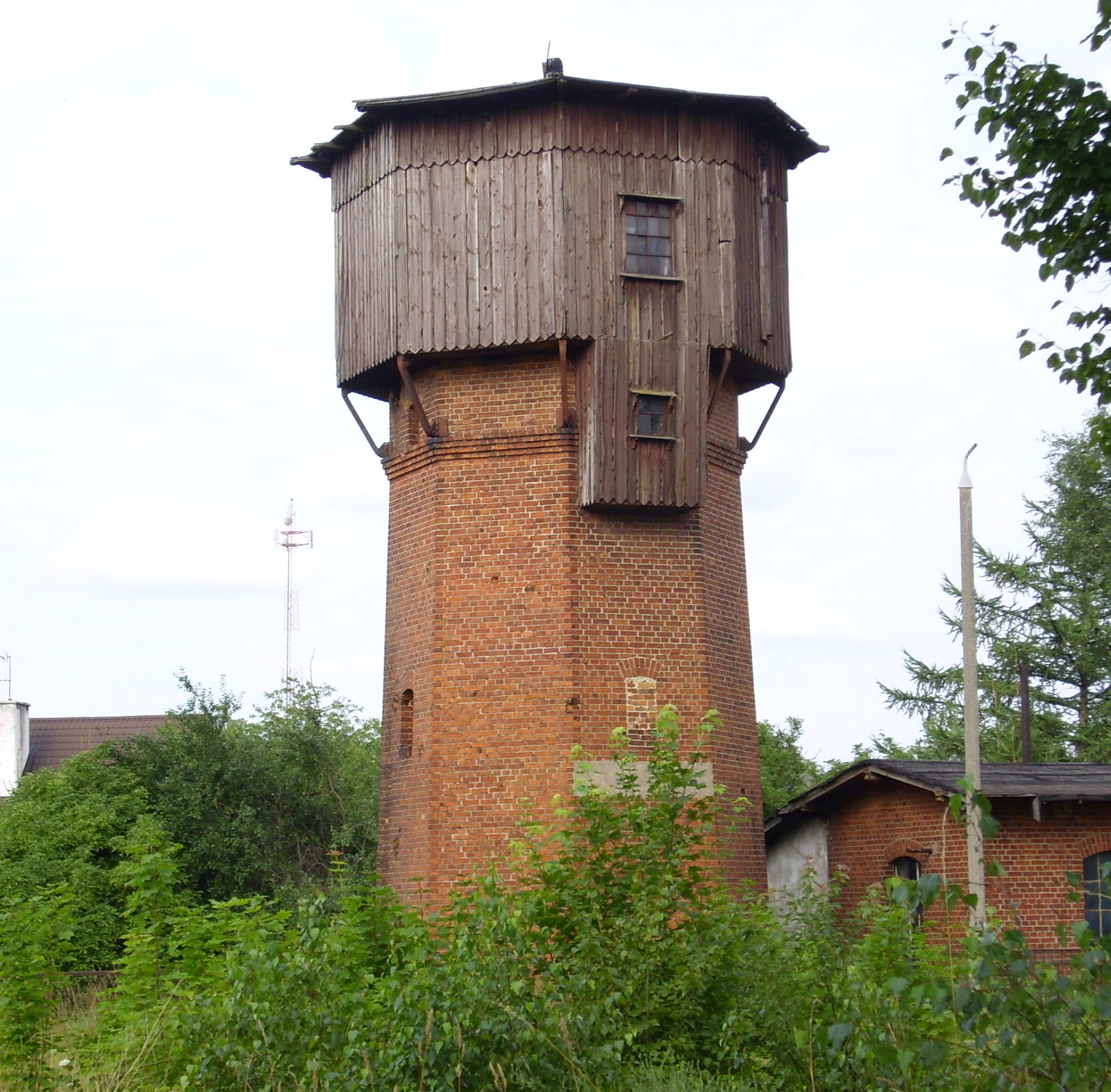
- Water tower

- Location within Poland
- Coordinates: 53°22′N 20°36′E
- Country: Poland
- Voivodeship: Warmian-Masurian
- County: Nidzica
- Gmina: Janowo

Population
  - Total: 520
- Time zone: UTC+1 (CET)
  - Summer (DST): UTC+2 (CEST)
- Postal code: 13-113
- Vehicle registration: NNI

Muszaki [muˈʂaki] is a village in the administrative district of Gmina Janowo, within Nidzica County, Warmian-Masurian Voivodeship, in northern Poland. It is located in Masuria.

== History ==
As of 1600, the population of the village was solely Polish. As of 1877, the village had a population of 468, Polish by ethnicity, mostly living off potato cultivation and sheep farming.

During World War II, the Polish resistance was active in the area. In 1943, Polish partisans of the Home Army disarmed a German gendarmerie post in the village. On 11 November 1944, the Home Army blew up a bridge and a railroad near the local train station.
