= Nangar Khel =

- Location in Afghanistan
- Coordinates: 32°26′23″N 68°22′8″E
- Country: Afghanistan
- Province: Paktika Province
- Elevation: 6,990 ft (2,130 m)
- Time zone: UTC+4:30

Nangar Khel (Pashto: ننګر خېل) is a village in the Paktika Province, southeastern Afghanistan, located in the mountains at the altitude of 2,130 metres (6,990 ft). Its coordinates are 32°26′23″N 68°22′8″E.

== See also ==
- Nangar Khel incident
- Paktika Province
