= Orłowo, Nidzica County =

Orłowo
- Village
- Location within Poland
- Coordinates: 53°28′N 20°28′E
- Country: Poland
- Voivodeship: Warmian-Masurian
- County: Nidzica
- Gmina: Nidzica

Orłowo [ɔrˈwɔvɔ] is a village in the administrative district of Gmina Nidzica, within Nidzica County, Warmian-Masurian Voivodeship, in northern Poland.
