= Fritz Maxin =

German politician (1885–1960)

Reichstag
- In office 1921–1924
- Constituency: East Prussia

Personal details
- Born: 17 July 1885 Wichrowitz, East Prussia, Imperial Germany
- Died: 5 March 1960 (aged 74) Stade, West Germany
- Party: DNVP

Fritz Wilhelm Maxin (17 July 1885 – 5 March 1960) was a German politician and lay preacher.

== Biography ==
Maxin was born into a peasant family in the Masurian village of Wichrowitz (today Wichrowiec, Poland), where he visited school and worked on his family's farm. He married in 1913 and became engaged as a lay preacher of the gromadki-movement in the East Prussian Lutheran Prayer Community (Ostpreußischer Lutherischer Gebetsverein).

After World War I he joined the German National People's Party (DNVP) and was elected as deputy of the Constituency 1 (East Prussia) to the Weimar German Reichstag. Maxin was a member of the Reichstag in 1921 till 1924 and became the Chairman of the Wichrowitz commune and member of the district parliament of Neidenburg.

After the Nazis took over power in Germany in 1933, his citizens involvement was prohibited and Maxin joined the oppositional old-Prussian Confessing Church in 1934. He became a member of the Brethren Council of Confessing Church and organized Lutheran youth camps and Church services on his farm, which caused permanent supervision by the Gestapo.

In 1945 Maxin fled to West Germany, where he died in Stade in 1960.
