= Nidzica County =

Nidzica County Powiat nidzicki
- County
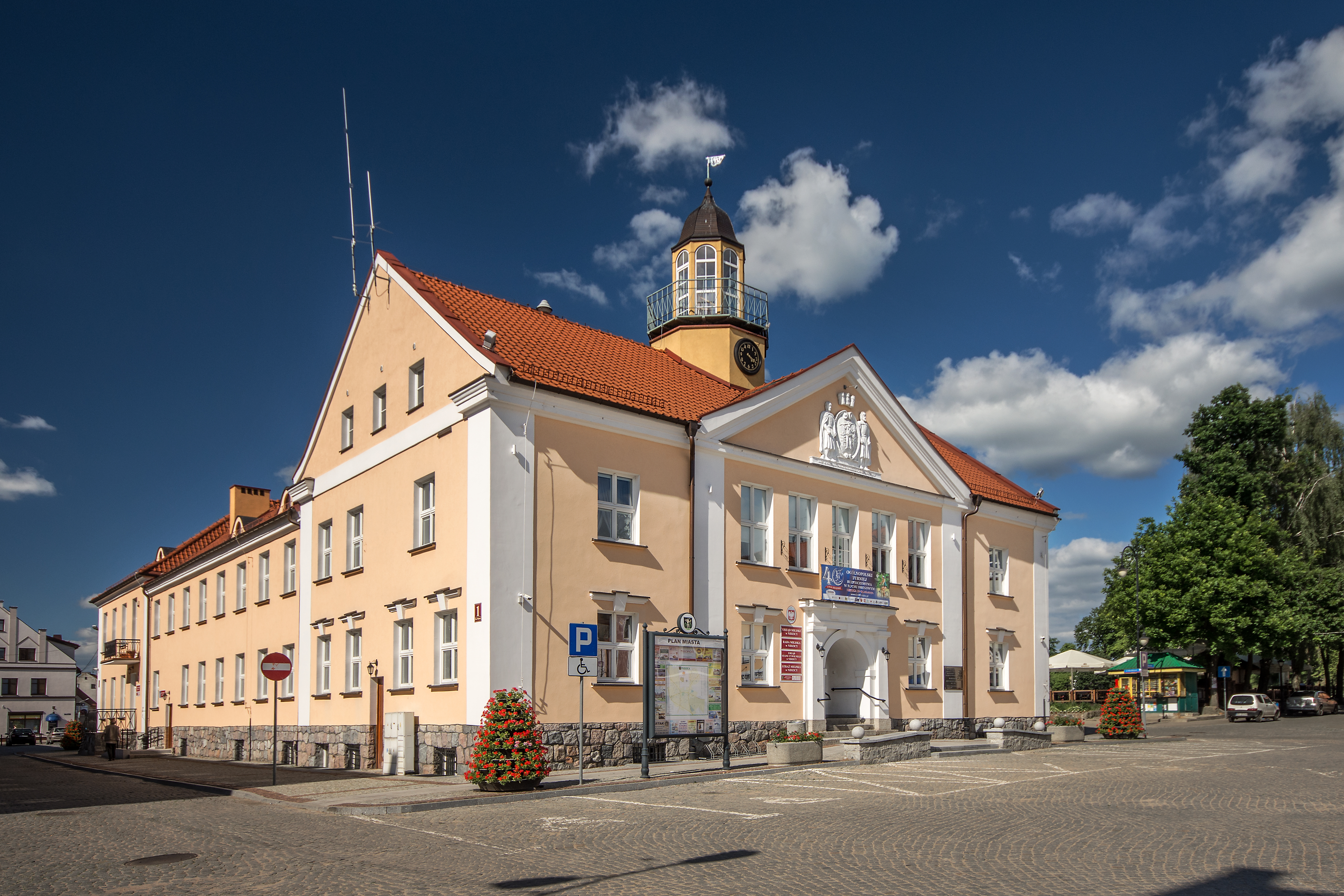
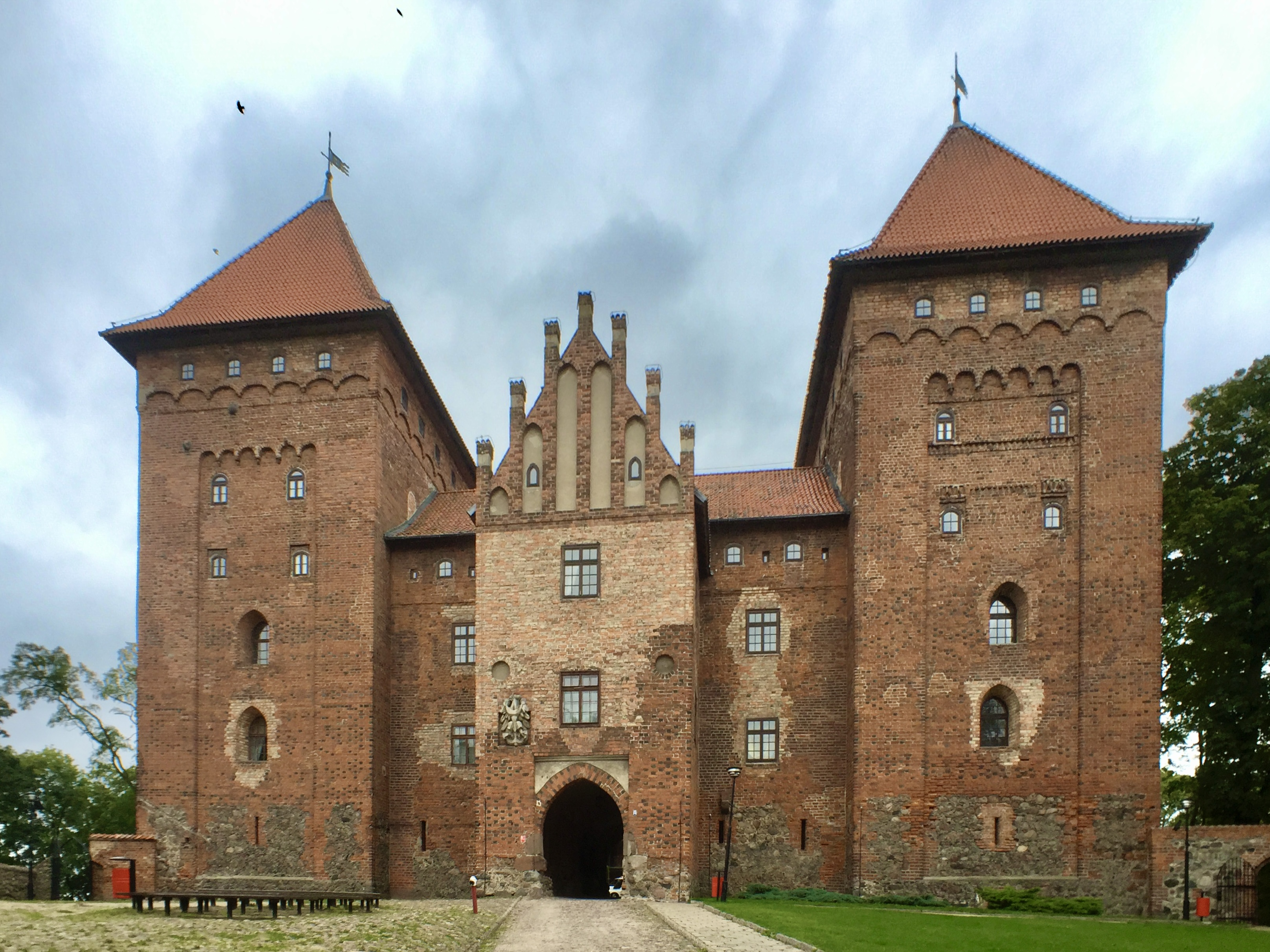
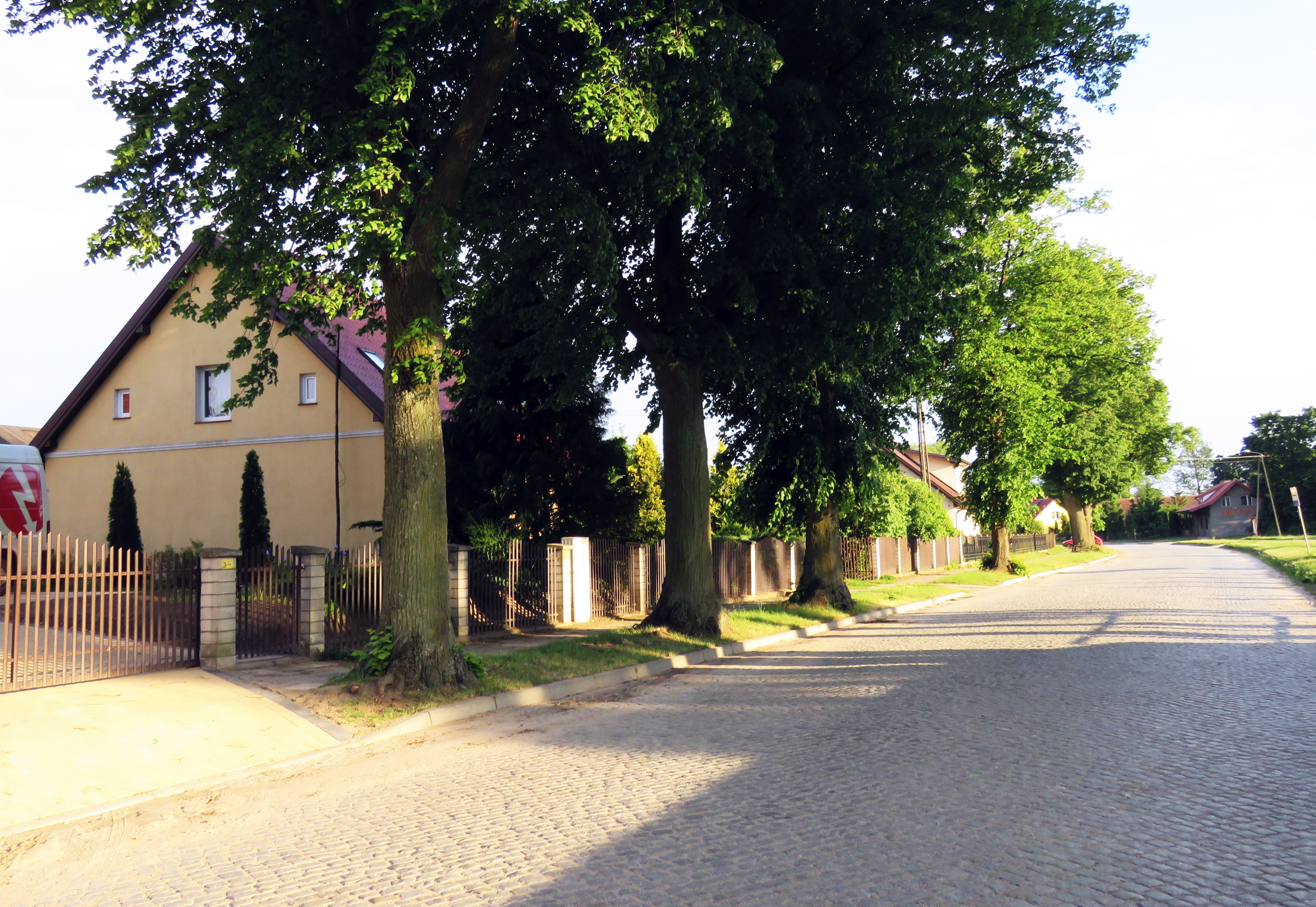
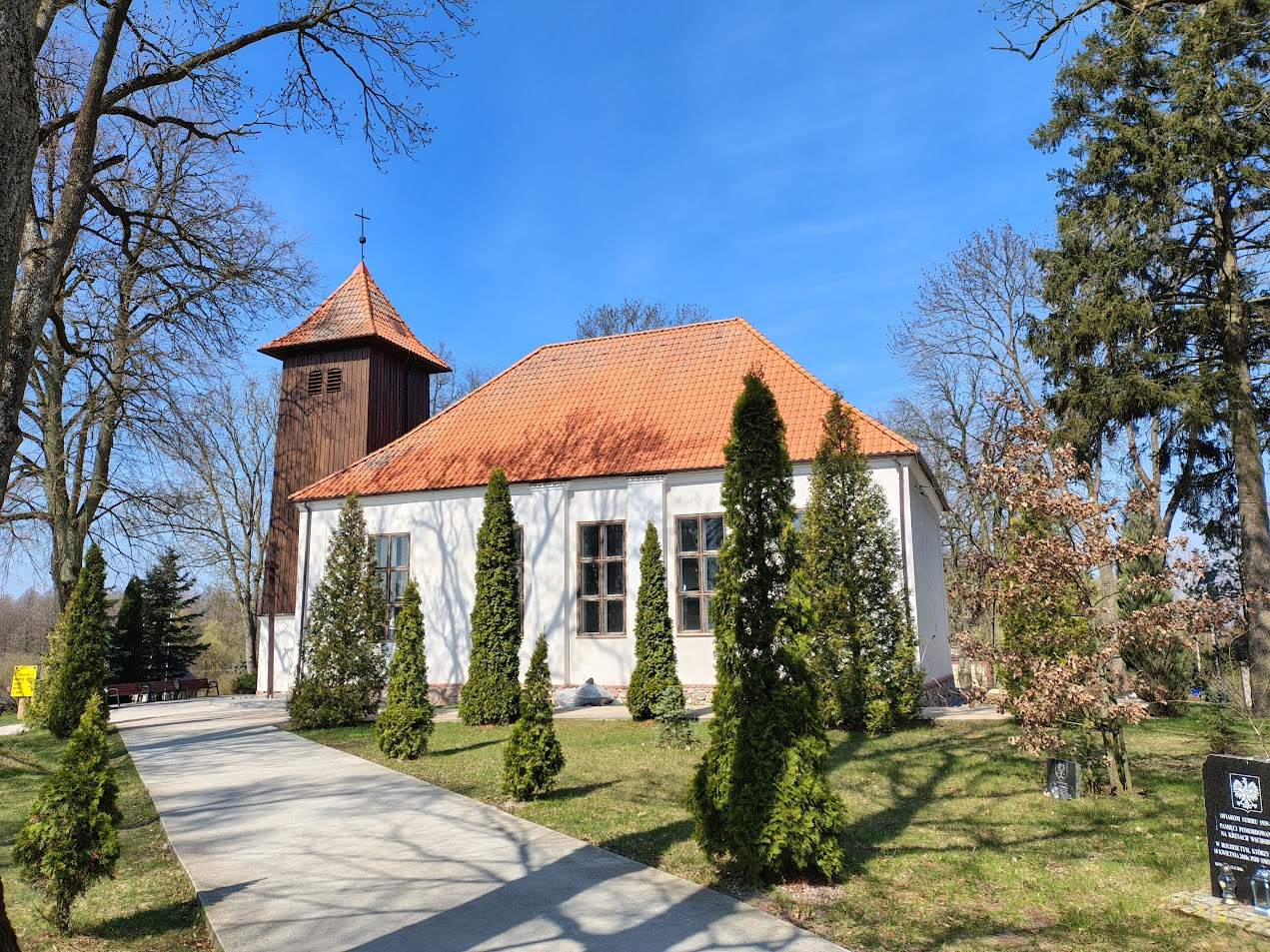
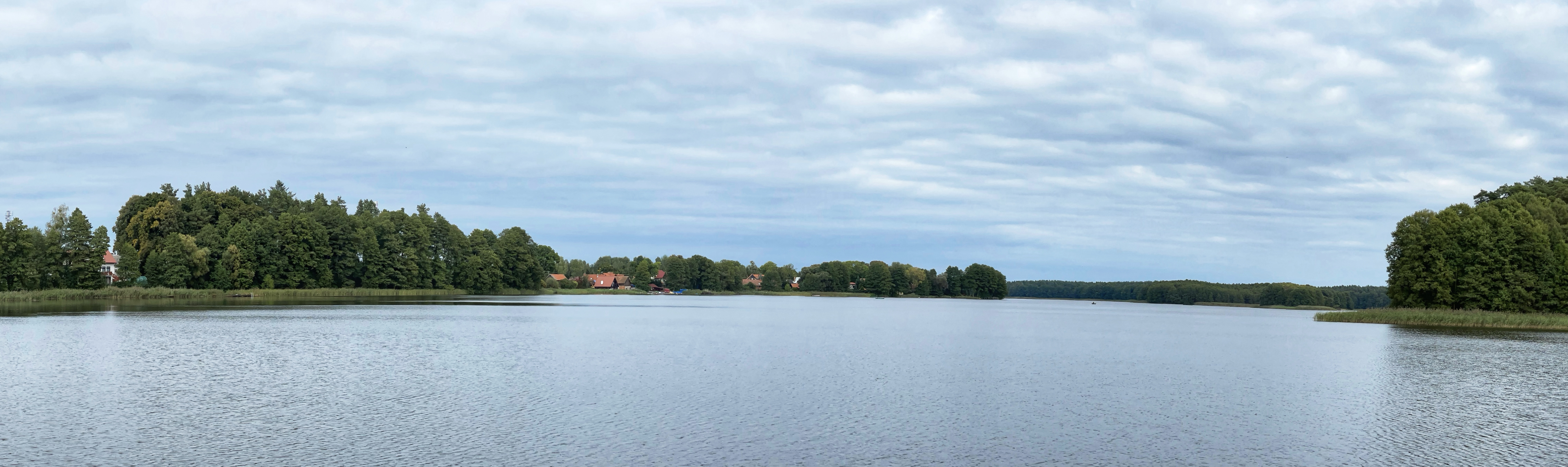
- Nidzica town hall Nidzica Castle Kanigowo Saints Peter and Paul church in Kozłowo Omulew Lake in Jabłonka

- Flag Coat of arms

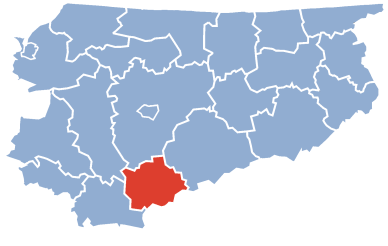
- Location within the voivodeship

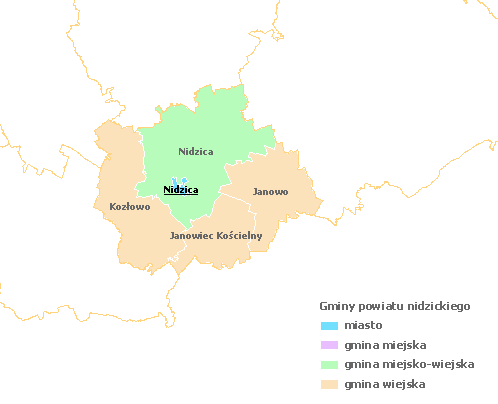
- Division into gminas
- Coordinates (Nidzica): 53°21′30″N 20°25′30″E
- Country: Poland
- Voivodeship: Warmian-Masurian
- Seat: Nidzica
- Gminas: Total 4: Gmina Janowiec Kościelny; Gmina Janowo; Gmina Kozłowo; Gmina Nidzica

Area
  - total: 960.7 km^{2} (370.9 sq mi)

Population (2006)
  - total: 33,955
  - Density: 35.34/km^{2} (91.54/sq mi)
  - Urban: 14,761
  - Rural: 19,194
- Time zone: UTC+1 (CET)
  - Summer (DST): UTC+2 (CEST)
- Car plates: NNI
- Website: www.powiatnidzicki.pl

Nidzica County (Polish: powiat nidzicki) is a unit of territorial administration and local government (powiat) in Warmian-Masurian Voivodeship, northern Poland. It came into being on 1 January 1999, as a result of the Polish local government reforms passed in 1998. Its administrative seat and only town is Nidzica, which lies 48 kilometres (30 mi) south of the regional capital Olsztyn.

The county covers an area of 960.7 square kilometres (370.9 sq mi). As of 2006, its total population is 33,955, out of which the population of Nidzica is 14,761 and the rural population is 19,194.

== Population ==
The county's population has stagnated and remained the same for the past four decades, never surpassing the 35,300 mark.

== Historical population ==
In 1825, Nidzica County (Kreis Neidenburg) had 29,617 inhabitants, including by mother tongue: 27,467 (~93%) Polish and 2,149 (~7%) German.

== Neighbouring counties ==
Nidzica County is bordered by Olsztyn County to the north, Szczytno County to the east, Przasnysz County to the south-east, Mława County to the south, Działdowo County to the south-west and Ostróda County to the north-west.

== Administrative division ==
The county is subdivided into four gminas (one urban-rural and three rural). These are listed in the following table, in descending order of population.

Gmina	Type	Area (km^{2})	Population (2006)	Seat
Gmina Nidzica	urban-rural	378.9	21,485	Nidzica
Gmina Kozłowo	rural	254.0	6,141	Kozłowo
Gmina Janowiec Kościelny	rural	136.3	3,443	Janowiec Kościelny
Gmina Janowo	rural	191.6	2,886	Janowo

== See also ==
- List of counties in Poland
