= Waga =

Waga or WAGA may refer to:

== Broadcasting ==
- WAGA-TV, a television station in Atlanta, Georgia, U.S.
- WVEE, a radio station in Atlanta, Georgia, formerly WAGA-FM from 1948 to 1959
- WDWD, a radio station in Atlanta, Georgia, formerly WAGA from 1937 to 1959

== People ==
- Antoni Waga (1799–1890), Polish naturalist
- Jakub Ignacy Waga (1800–1872), Polish botanist
- Viliame Waqaseduadua (born 1983), New Zealand rugby union player known as Waga

== Places ==
- Waga District, Iwate, Japan
- Waga River, in Iwate Prefecture, Japan

== Other uses ==
- Waga sculpture, a type of Ethiopian memorial carving
- Wakka Wakka language, or Waga, an extinct language of Australia
- Waga coat of arms, a Polish coat of arms
