= Pociej =

Pociej is a surname. Notable people with this surname include:

- Aleksander Pociej (born 1965), Polish politician
- Bohdan Pociej (1933–2011), Polish musicologist
- Hypatius Pociej (1541–1613), Metropolitan of Kiev
- Ludwik Pociej (1664–1730), Polish nobleman
