= Szubert =

Szubert is a Polish surname from German Schubert. Notable people with the surname include:

- Dariusz Szubert (born 1970), Polish footballer and coach
- Michał Szubert (1787–1860), Polish biologist and botanist
