= Our Lady of the Gate of Dawn =

Lithuanian painting of the Virgin Mary

- Aušros Vartų Dievo Motina (Lithuanian)
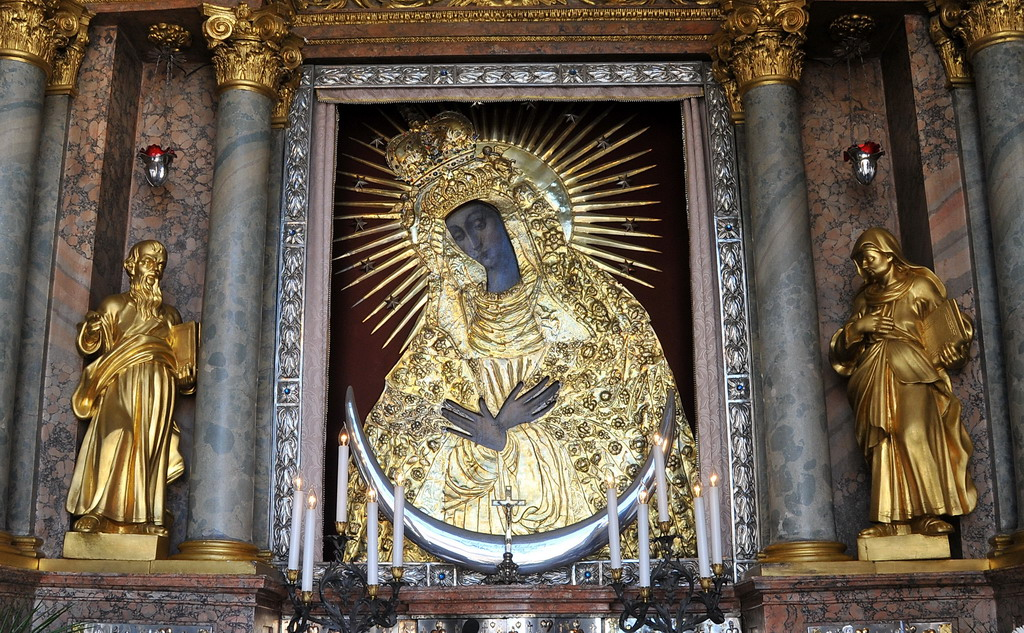
- Type: Painting
- Medium: Tempera on oak planks
- Subject: Blessed Virgin Mary
- Dimensions: 200 cm × 163 cm (79 in × 64 in)
- Condition: On display
- Location: Chapel of the Gate of Dawn, Vilnius; 54°40′27.56″N 25°17′22.18″E

Our Lady of the Gate of Dawn (Lithuanian: Aušros Vartų Dievo Motina) or Our Lady of the Sharp Gate (Polish: Matka Boża Ostrobramska, Belarusian: Маці Божая Вастрабрамская, Russian: Остробрамская икона Божией Матери) is a prominent Catholic image of the Blessed Virgin Mary venerated by the faithful in the Chapel of the Gate of Dawn (or Sharp Gate) in Vilnius, Lithuania. The painting was historically displayed above the Vilnius city gate; city gates of the time often contained religious artifacts intended to ward off attacks and bless passing travellers.

The painting is in the Northern Renaissance style and was completed most likely around 1630. The Virgin Mary is depicted without the infant Jesus. The artwork soon became known as miraculous and inspired a following. A dedicated chapel was built in 1671 by the Discalced Carmelites. At the same time, possibly borrowing from the Eastern Orthodox tradition, the painting was covered in an expensive and elaborate silver and gold riza, leaving only the face and hands visible.

On 5 July 1927, the image was canonically crowned by Pope Pius XI. The chapel was later visited by Pope John Paul II in 1993. It is a major site of pilgrimage in Vilnius and attracts many visitors, especially from Poland.

== History ==
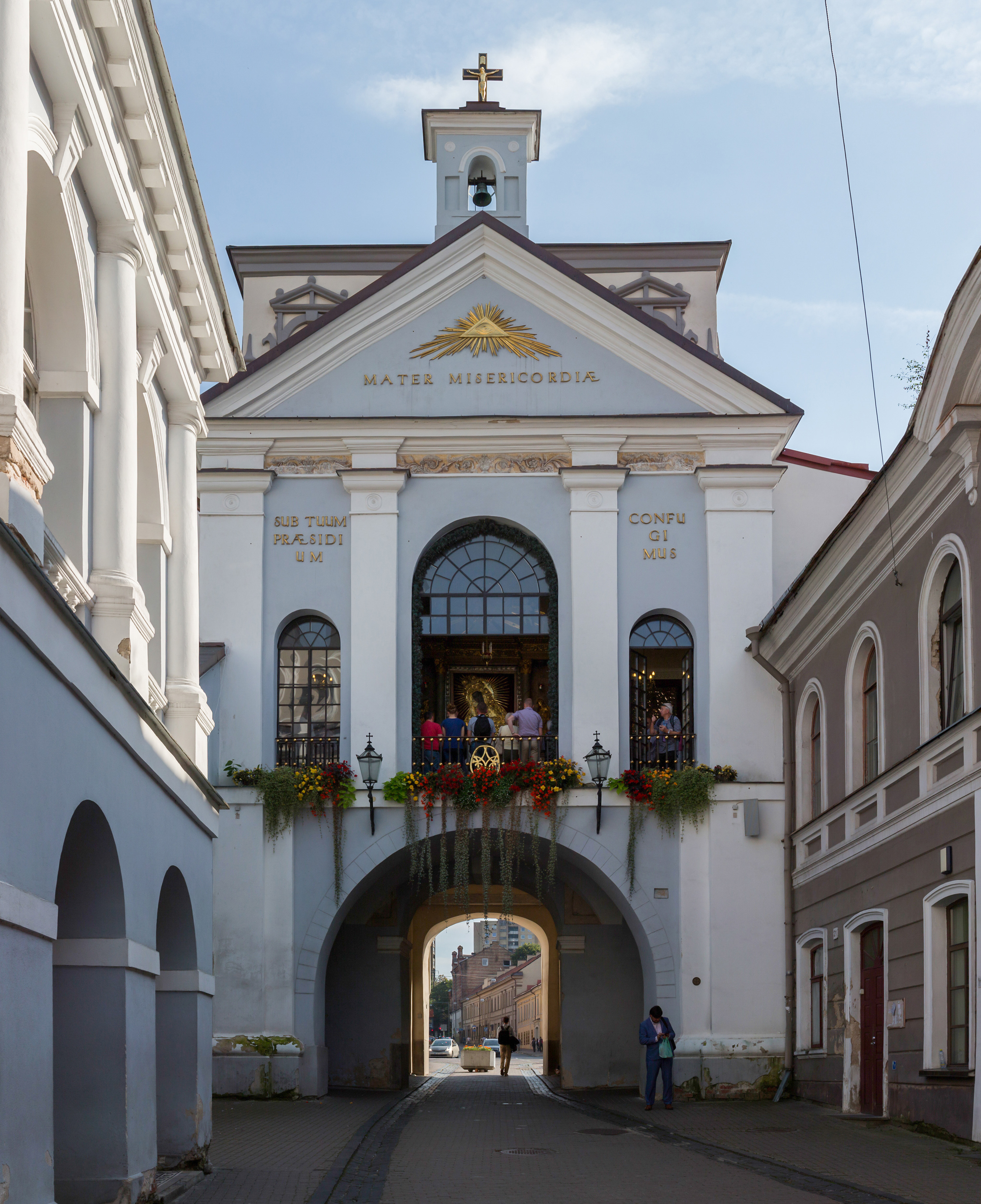
The Gate of Dawn in Vilnius; the painting can be seen through the glass window

The legend tells that in 1702, when Vilnius was captured by the Swedish army during the Great Northern War, Our Lady of the Gate of Dawn came to her people's rescue. At dawn, the heavy iron city gates fell, crushing and killing four Swedish soldiers. After this, the Polish–Lithuanian Commonwealth Army successfully counter-attacked near the gate.

It is believed that the painting was commissioned by the government of Vilnius. It was customary to place paintings or sculptures of various saints in niches of walls hoping that they would protect the building. The governor of Vilnius ordered two paintings, one depicting Christ the Saviour (Salvator Mundi), and the other the Virgin Mary. Both of them decorated the Gate of Dawn of the Vilnius city wall – a defensive structure with no religious importance at the time. The painting of Christ decorated the exterior of the gate, while that of the Virgin was in the same place as it is now – a small niche, protected by shutters from rain and snow. Narrow and steep stairs led to a small balcony where the faithful could light candles and pray. In 1650, Albert Wijuk Kojałowicz published Miscellanea, listing all miraculous paintings of Mary, but did not mention Our Lady of the Gate of the Dawn.

In the mid-17th century the Discalced Carmelites built the Church of Saint Teresa and their monastery near the Gate of Dawn. In 1655, the city was captured, looted, and depopulated during the Battle of Vilnius of the Russo-Polish War. It was likely that the city government, short of funds, transferred maintenance of the gate and the paintings to the Carmelites. The painting of Christ was moved to the Carmelite monastery and later to Vilnius Cathedral (a fresco of Jesus was painted in its original niche in the 19th century; it was uncovered in 1976). In 1671, the monks built a wooden chapel to Our Lady next to the gate tower; it was around the time that the painting was covered in expensive silver riza. By then, the painting was already an object of public veneration and the chapel dedication ceremony was attended by many prominent figures of the time including Chancellor Krzysztof Zygmunt Pac, Grand Hetman Michał Kazimierz Pac, and senators of the general sejm.

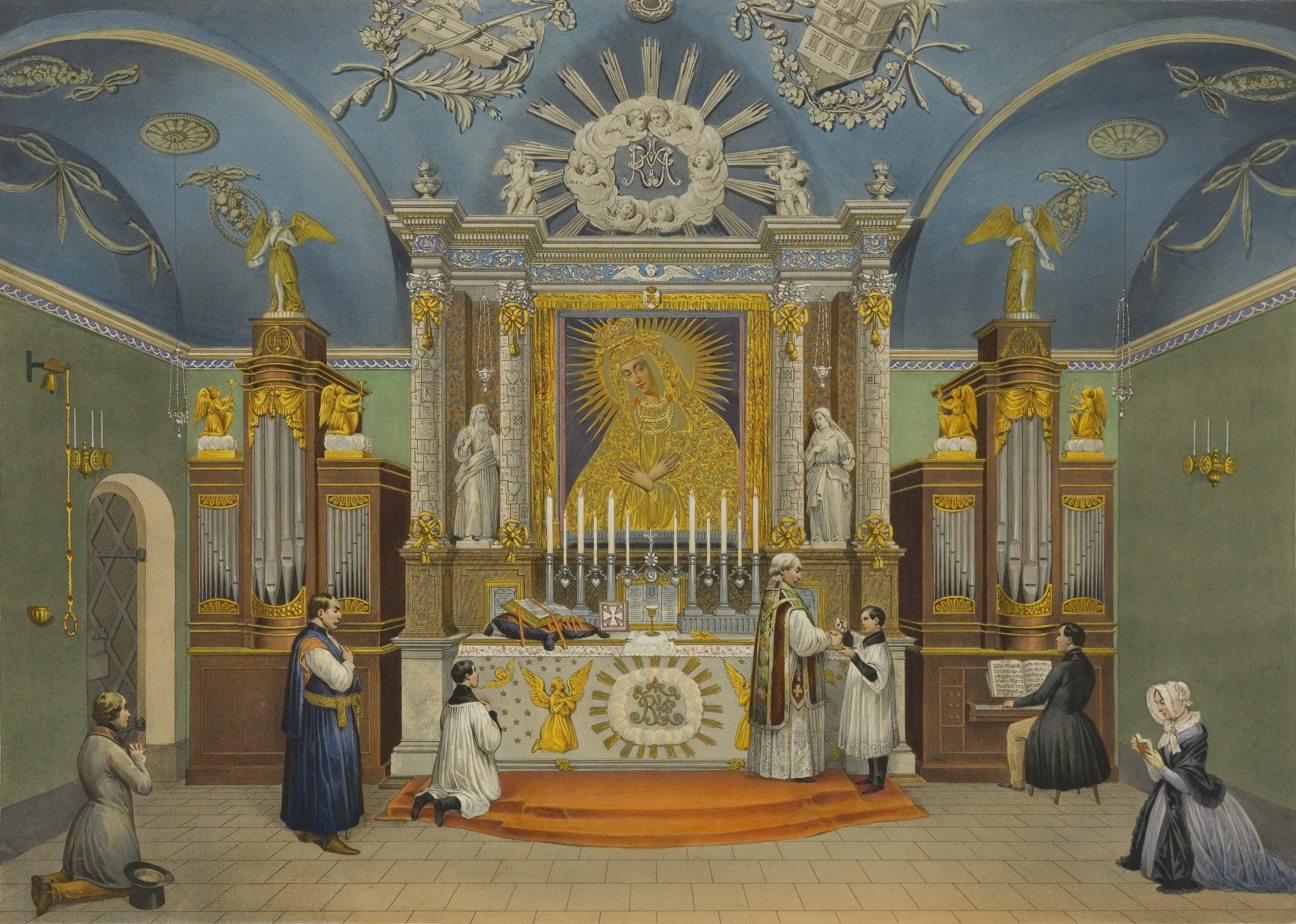
Interior of the chapel of Our Lady of the Gate of Dawn, as a Mass is celebrated (1847)

In May 1715, the wooden chapel burnt down, but the painting was saved and placed in the Church of St Teresa. In 1720, the current brick chapel was dedicated in the presence of four bishops, a number of senators, and a large crowd of the faithful. According to eighteenth-century Carmelite sources, both Latin and Greek Masses were said before the painting, venerated equally by the Roman Catholics and the Greek Catholics (Uniates). In 1761, the monk Hilarion published Relacja o cudownym Obrazie Naijświętszej Marji Panny etc, the primary source for the painting's early history and also the first collection of various miracles attributed to it. In 1773 Pope Clement XIV granted an indulgence to the faithful, designating the chapel as a place of public worship, and established a charitable society. At the turn of the 19th century, Tsarist authorities demolished the city wall and all the city's gates, except the Gate of Dawn and its chapel. In 1829, the chapel underwent restoration and acquired elements of late Neoclassicism. Since the entrance to the chapel was from inside the Carmelite monastery, women could not go inside. Because of this, one female devotee sponsored the construction of a two-storey gallery on the side of the street in 1830.

In 1927, major restoration works were completed under bishop Romuald Jałbrzykowski. With permission from Pope Pius XI, the painting was solemnly crowned Mother of Mercy on 2 July 1927 by the Archbishop of Warsaw Alexander Cardinal Kakowski. The ceremony was attended by President Ignacy Mościcki, First Marshal Jozef Pilsudski, Primate of Poland August Hlond, 28 other bishops, and other dignitaries.

== Painting ==
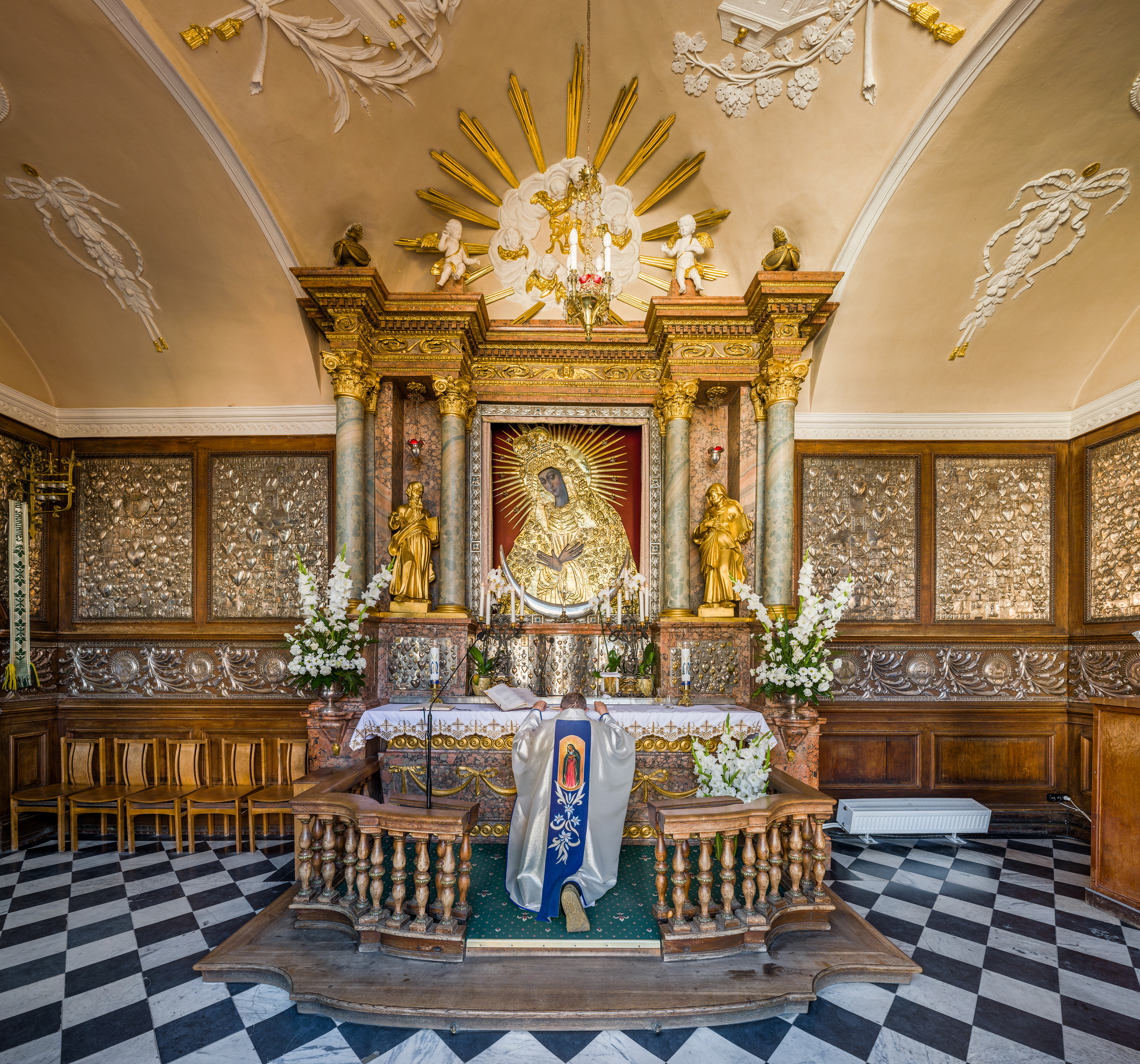
Interior of the Chapel of the Gate of Dawn, during a Mass (2014)

=== Origin and inspiration ===
The origin of the painting is not known. According to historian Teodor Narbutt (1784–1864), the painting was acquired by Algirdas, Grand Duke of Lithuania (ruled 1345–1377), as a war trophy from Crimea. This note, based on dubious sources, along with dark colors of the painting that resembled Byzantine icons, inspired 19th-century Russian historians to claim that the painting was Orthodox and not Roman Catholic. This theory was popularized in various articles, brochures, studies and is sometimes quoted today. Others claimed that the painting was commissioned by King of Poland Sigismund II Augustus and depicted his wife Barbara Radziwiłł.

With a silver riza covering the entire painting, except for the face and hands, it was very hard for art historians to determine in what period the painting was created. In 1927, the silver cover was removed for the first time in decades. The painting was analyzed and restored. Based on the new data gathered during the restoration, Mieczysław Skrudlik came to a conclusion that the painting was completed around 1630–1650 and linked it with another painting in the Corpus Christi Church in Kraków, created by artist Luke in 1624. Mary Kałamajska Saeed in her 1990 thesis argued that Our Lady of the Gate of Dawn was a work of a local artist and was inspired by contemporary Flemish mannerist painter Marten de Vos through an engraving of Thomas de Leu. In 1993, on the occasion of pope's visit, the painting was restored and one of its planks was dated based on its tree-rings. The scientists concluded that the oak grew in 1434–1620.

=== Description ===
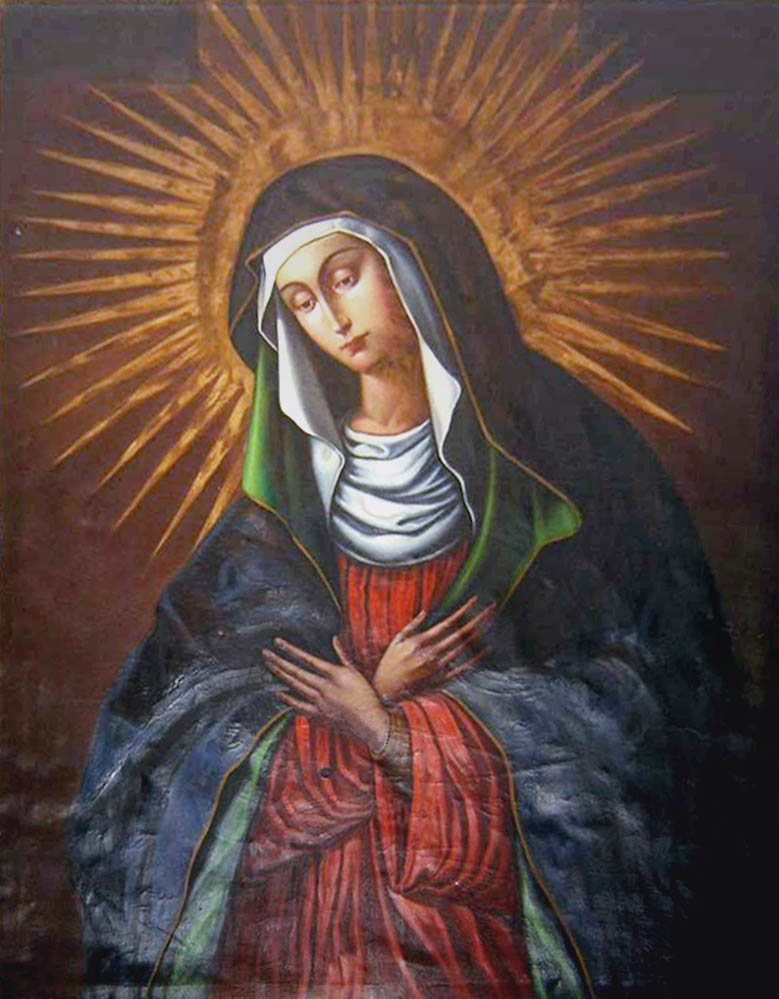
Our Lady of the Gate of Dawn, without the riza. The bullet hole from 1702 is on her red, right sleeve.

The original painting is 163 by 200 centimetres (64 in × 79 in) and was painted by an unknown artist on eight oak planks 2-centimetre (0.79 in) thick. As usual for Northern Europe, a very thin layer of chalk priming was applied to the planks before painting in tempera. Later Our Lady was repainted in oil paint. Some restoration work was completed in the mid-19th century. Major restoration works were completed in 1927.

The painting depicts complex personality and devotion to Mary. Her head is gently leaning to her right, her eyes are half closed, her hands are crossed in devotion; this reminds that she is a virgin, humble servant of the Lord, merciful mother and patron of the people. At the same time, her head is surrounded by an aureola with golden rays and her body is usually covered in elaborate gold and silver rizas and crowns; these are the symbols of her divine and majestic role as the Queen of Heaven. The painting also reminds of Tota pulchra es (You are all beautiful), an old Catholic prayer.

=== Riza ===
The tradition to decorate paintings with a riza or revetment of precious metals may have been borrowed from Eastern Orthodoxy. The riza of Our Lady is composed of three gilded silver parts, each completed by different artists at a different period. The head and shoulders were covered in 1670–90; the chest piece was adapted from a different painting in 1695–1700; the bottom of the painting was completed by the 1730s. The revetments are richly decorated in floral motifs: roses, tulips, narcissi, carnations, and at least six other species.

The flowers were references to hortus conclusus (enclosed garden), and a symbol of Mary's virginity and purity. The circle of stars represents the Immaculate Conception. The head of Our Lady is adorned with two crowns. Two little angels lower the large Rococo-style crown with colored glass inlays upon the smaller Baroque crown. Some argued that the two crowns, resembling royal and ducal insignia, represented the Kingdom of Poland and the Grand Duchy of Lithuania respectively. In 1927, duplicate crowns were made of pure gold, donated by the people, and were blessed by Pope Pius XI. On 2 July 1927 the Canonical Coronation took place and the painting received the title of Mother of Mercy. The gold crowns were lost, possibly during World War II.

On certain occasions, the image has been displayed without its riza for a limited time.

Sculptures of Mary's parents – St Joachim and St Anne – stand on both sides of the painting between the altar columns.

== Veneration ==
=== Miracles and votive offerings ===
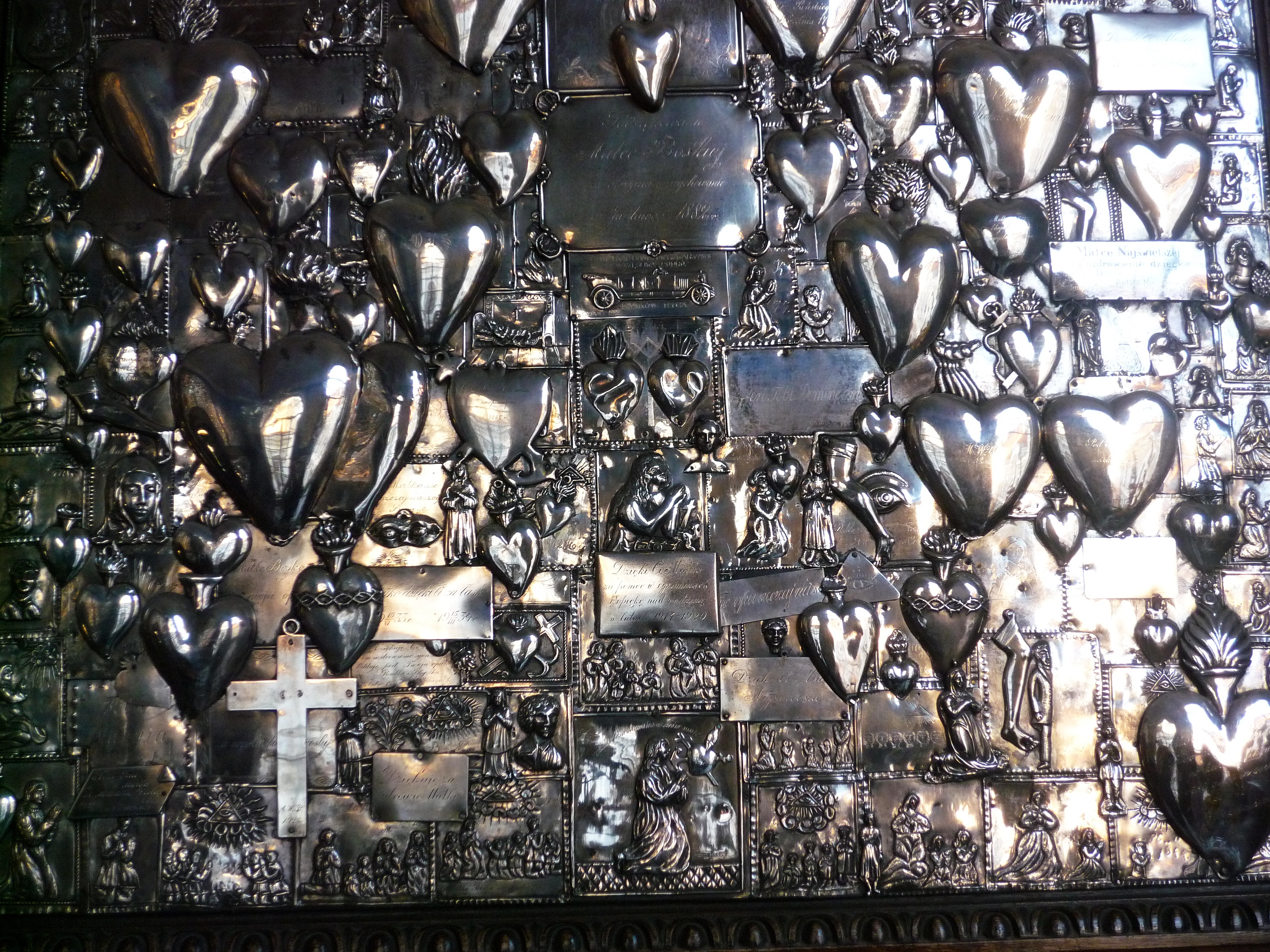
Detail of votive offerings

In 1761, the monk Hilarion published a book enumerating 17 miracles attributed to the painting and the Virgin Mary. The first miracle he recorded occurred in 1671, the same year the first chapel was built. A two-year-old child fell from the second floor onto a stone pavement and was badly injured. The parents then prayed to Our Lady and the next day the child was healthy once again. In 1702, Vilnius was captured by the Swedish Army during the Great Northern War. The Swedes, who were Protestants, mocked the painting, forbade songs and prayers, and caroused around the Gate of Dawn. One soldier even shot at the painting (the bullet hole can still be seen on the right sleeve). In the early morning of Great and Holy Saturday, the heavy iron gates fell and crushed four Swedish soldiers – two died instantly and two later from their injuries. The next day, Easter Sunday, the Lithuanian Army successfully counter-attacked near the gate. The commander, grateful for the victory, bestowed a large silver votive offering upon the chapel. The painting is also credited with other miracles: subduing a city fire in 1706, punishing a Russian soldier for an attempt to steal her silver riza in 1708, and numerous miraculous healings. Other stories of various miracles were kept by the Carmelite monks, but those books have not survived.

Votive offerings became a tradition. They are usually small silver objects (hearts, crucifixes, figures of praying people, images of cured eyes, legs, arms). Several times (1799, 1808, 1810) some of these objects were taken down and melted into liturgical objects. In 1844 there was a total of 785 offerings. Twelve years later, in 1856, the number had almost doubled to 1,438. From 1884 to 1927 a journal of new offerings was kept. During that time 2,539 new gifts were registered. Currently, there are about 8,000 silver votive objects in the chapel. The large crescent moon located right beneath Our Lady is also a votive offering. Its origins are unknown but it bears an inscription in Polish and a date of 1849. The crescent goes well with the silver riza, adding additional parallels with the Woman of the Apocalypse, described in the Book of Revelation as "a woman clothed with the sun, and the moon under her feet, and on her head a crown of twelve stars".

=== Divine Mercy ===
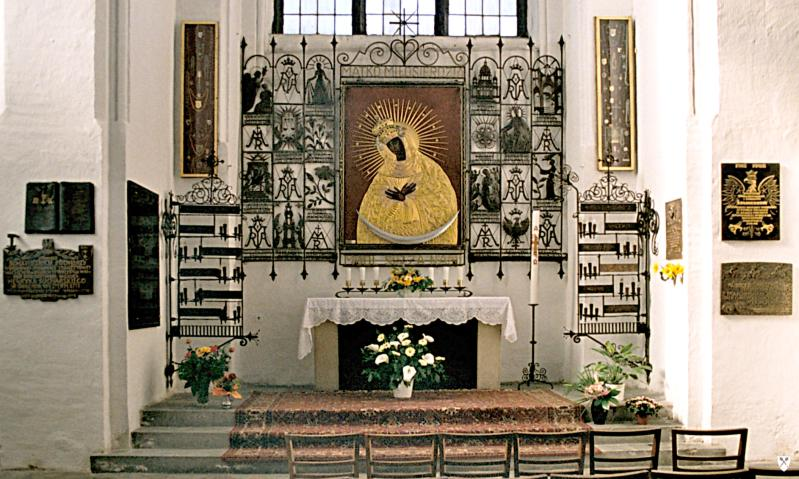
Chapel devoted to Our Lady of the Gate of Dawn in the St. Mary's Church in Gdańsk

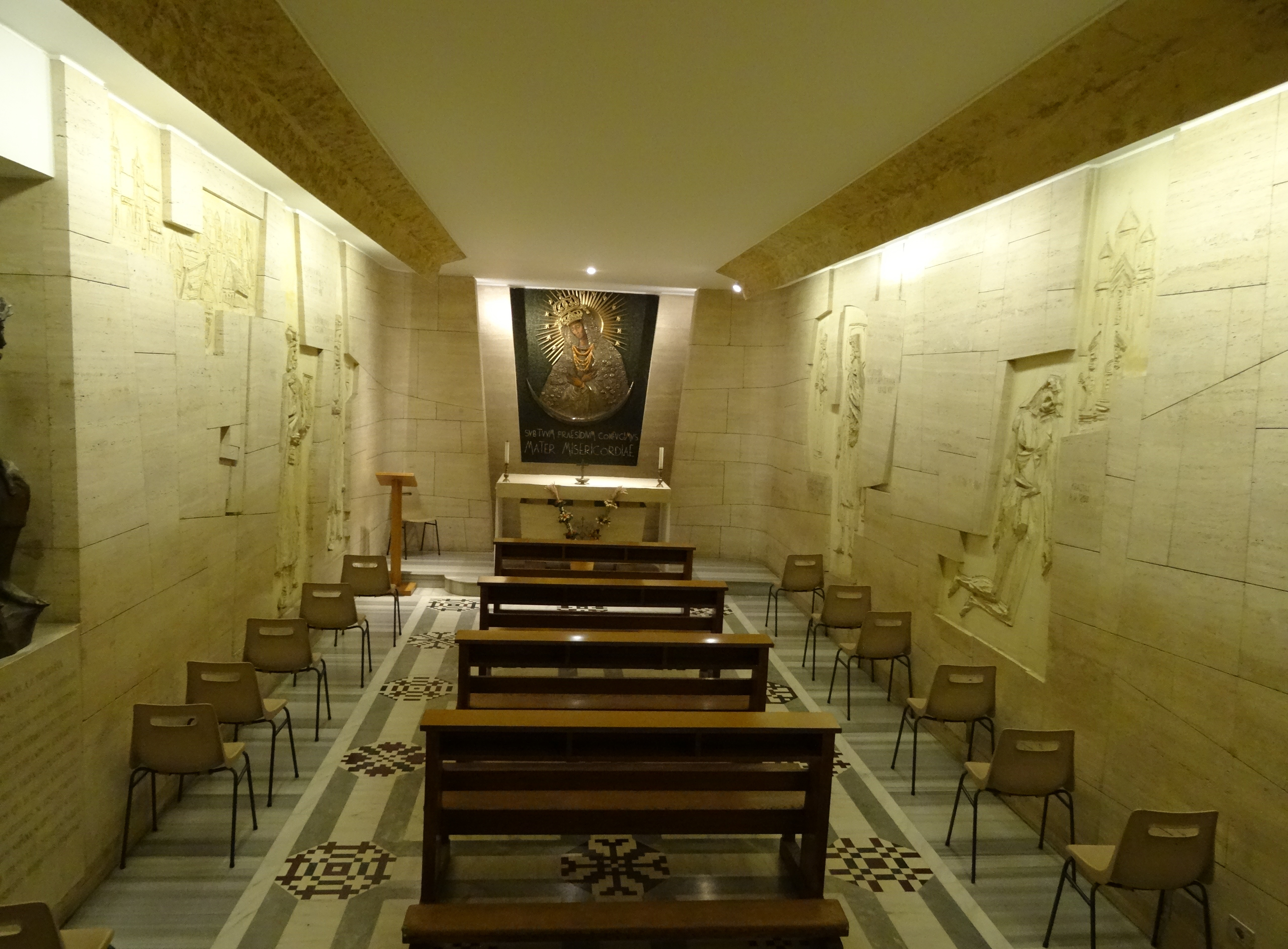
Lithuanian Chapel (Italian: Cappella Lituana) in the St. Peter's Basilica

The icon of Our Lady of the Gate of Dawn has become associated with the messages of Divine Mercy. Eight years after the icon was conferred the title of Mother of Mercy, the first exposition of the Divine Mercy image, painted by Eugene Kazimierowski under the direction of Faustina Kowalska, took place at the chapel in April 1935. In her Diary: Divine Mercy in My Soul, she writes of a mystical experience involving the icon in the Gate of Dawn chapel. On 15 November 1935, Saint Faustina was at the Gate of Dawn chapel participating in the last day of the novena before the feast day of the icon, 16 November. She writes of seeing the icon taking on "a living appearance" and speaking to her, telling her "accept all that God asked of me like a little child, without questioning; otherwise it would not be pleasing to God."

=== Shrines in other locations ===
The image is venerated by Catholics, Greek Catholics, and Eastern Orthodox Christians of many countries whose origins lie in the Polish–Lithuanian Commonwealth, including Lithuania, Poland, Belarus, Ukraine and their diasporas worldwide. In Lithuania itself there are 15 churches as well as Lithuanian parishes in Montreal and Buenos Aires devoted to the Blessed Virgin Mary of the Gate of Dawn. On 26 February 2007 the parish of Our Lady of Vilnius (Aušros Vartų Parapija) was closed by the Archdiocese of New York. The sanctuary had featured an icon of Our Lady, painted by the artist Tadas Sviderskis in the 1980s.

In Poland the biggest church devoted to Our Lady is the Marian Basilica in Gdańsk.

There is a Vilnius' Gate of Dawn Mother of Mercy Chapel (Italian: Cappella Lituana) in the St. Peter's Basilica in Vatican City. It was consecrated by the Pope Paul VI in 1970 and it is a place where Pope John Paul II had his first prayer after being elected as the Pope in 1978. Only Lithuania, Poland, Hungary and Ireland have such chapels in the St. Peter's Basilica.

=== Liturgical Commemoration ===
Our Lady of the Gate of Dawn is commemorated on November 16 in the Catholic Church and January 8 (December 26 O.S.) and April 27 (April 14 O.S.) in the Orthodox Church.

=== Seraphim-Diveyevo "Tenderness" icon of the Mother of God ===
The Seraphim-Diveyevo “Tenderness” icon belonged to Saint Seraphim of Sarov and was his cell icon, which he called “Joy of All Joys.” It is a variant copy of the icon of Our Lady of the Gate of Dawn and not an Eleusa icon despite being called "Tenderness". The icon is kept currently in the Vladimirskaya Church at the Patriarchal Residence in Chisty Lane.

== Gallery ==
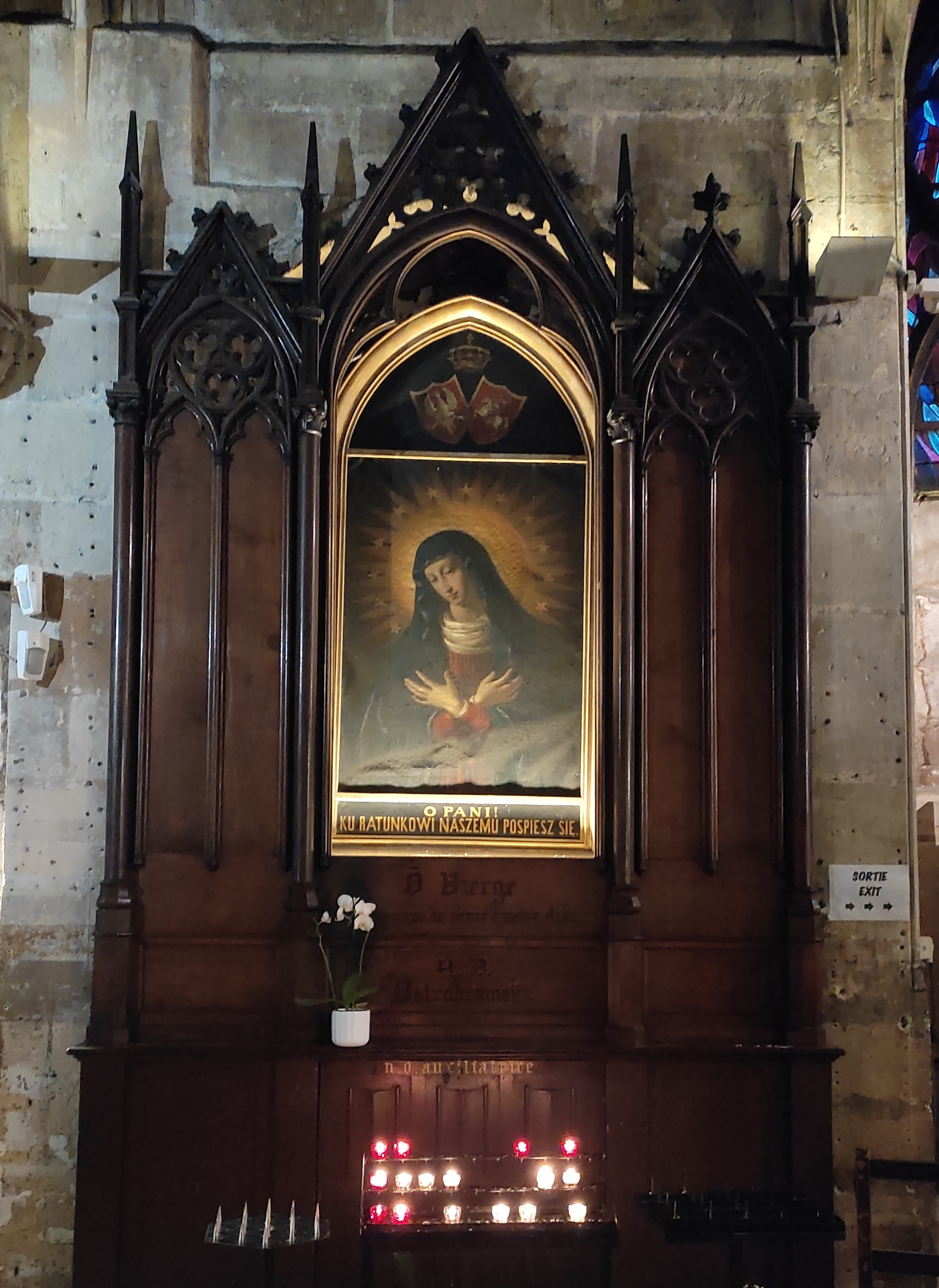
A nineteenth-century copy in Paris, Saint-Séverin church, with the coats of arms of Lithuania and Poland

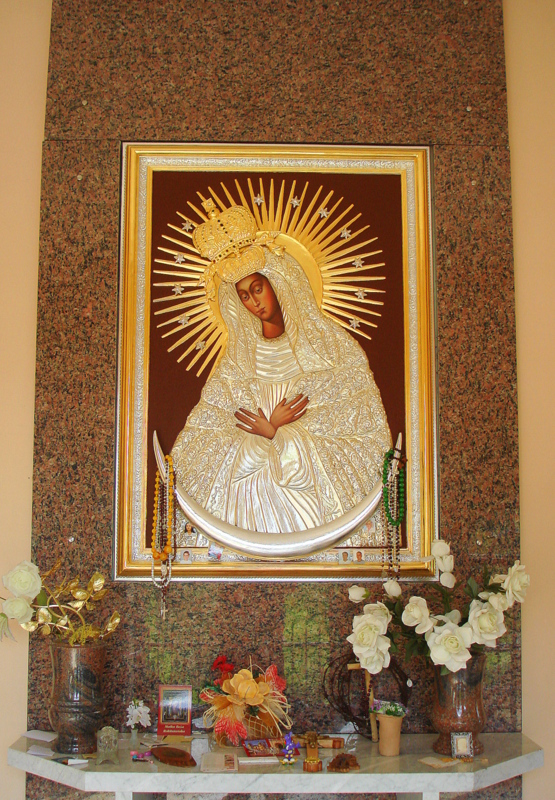
An altar featuring the icon in Rokitno

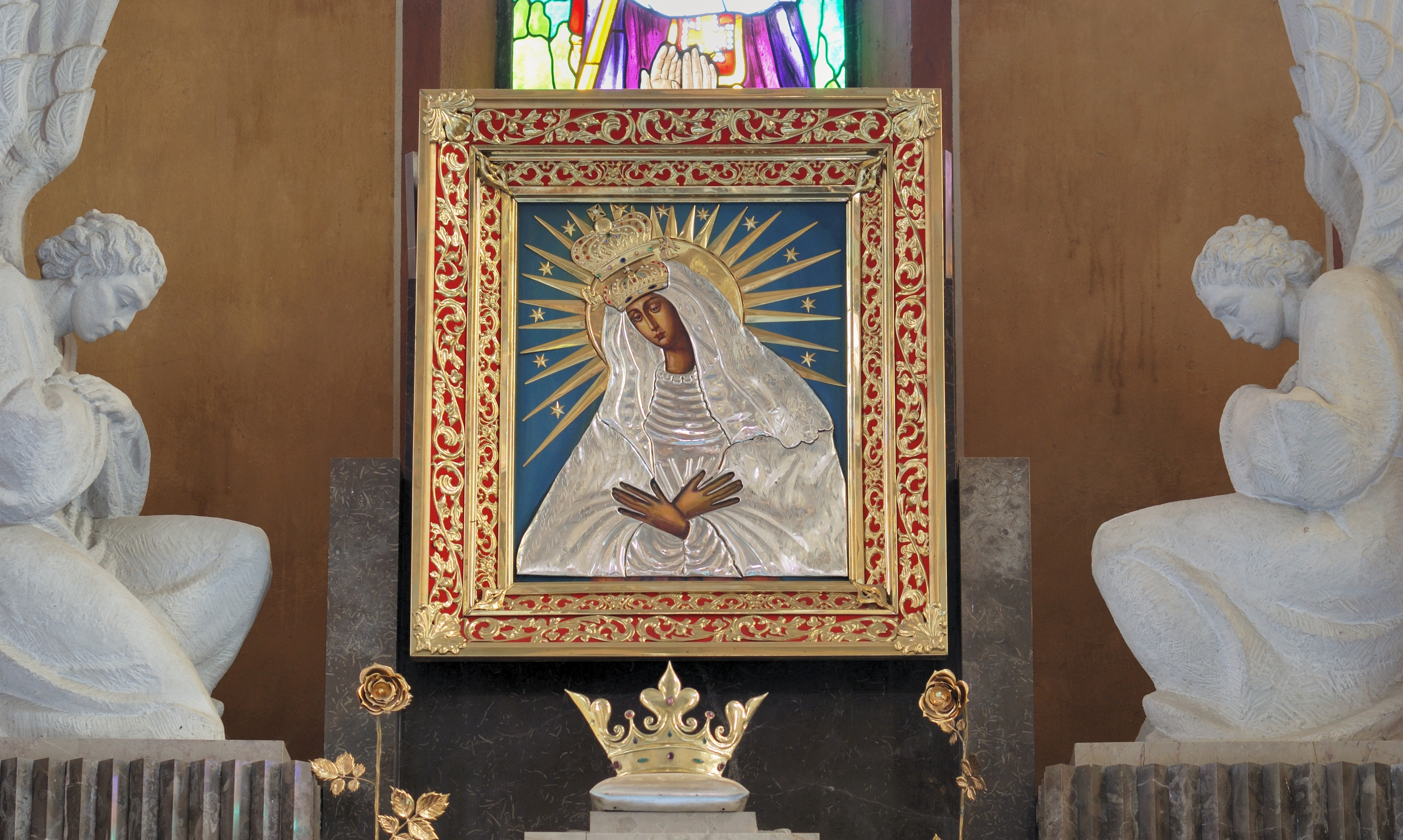
Icon at Church of Saint Stanislaus in Kosina

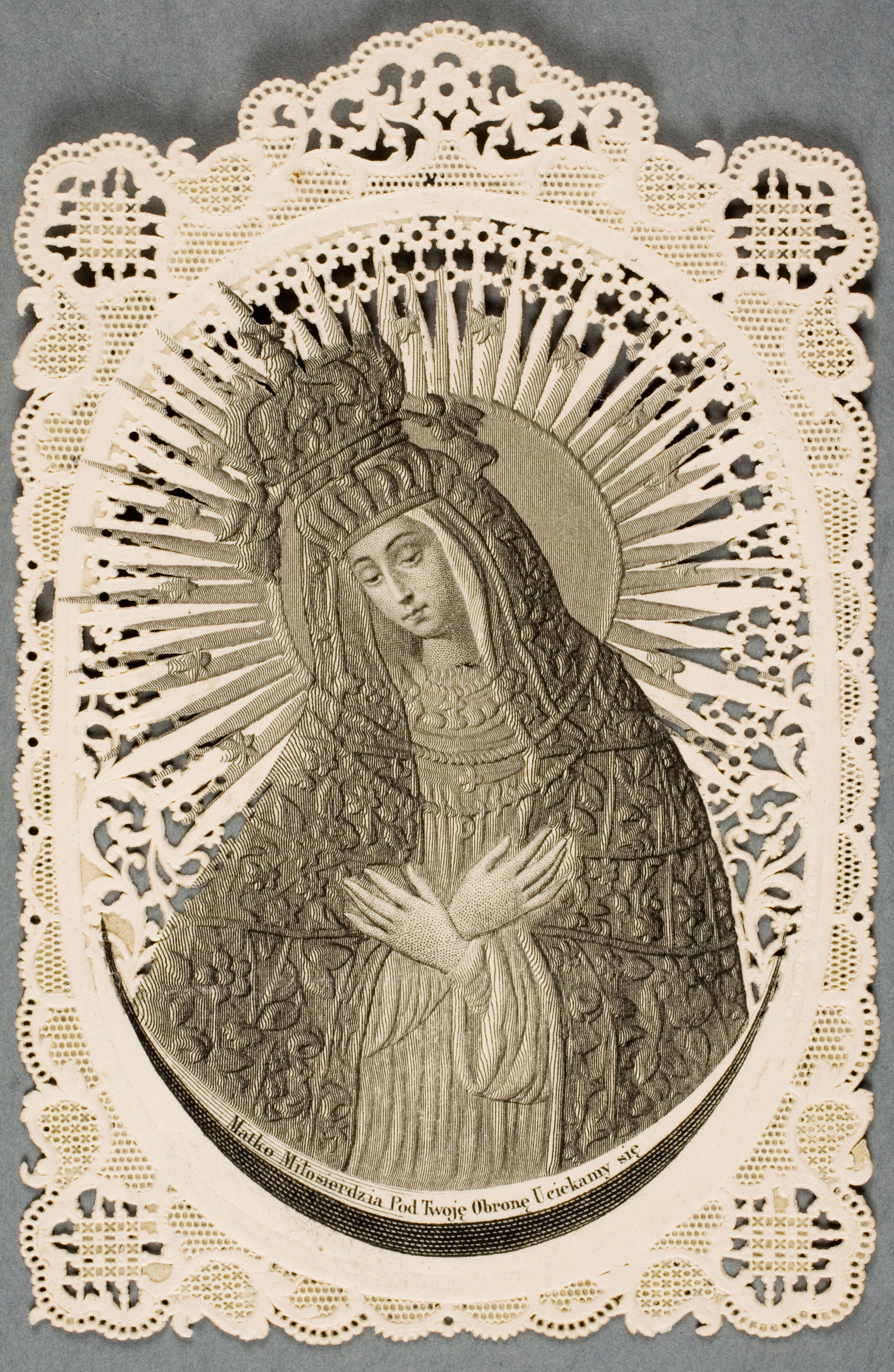
Lace decoration of Our Lady of the Gate of Dawn

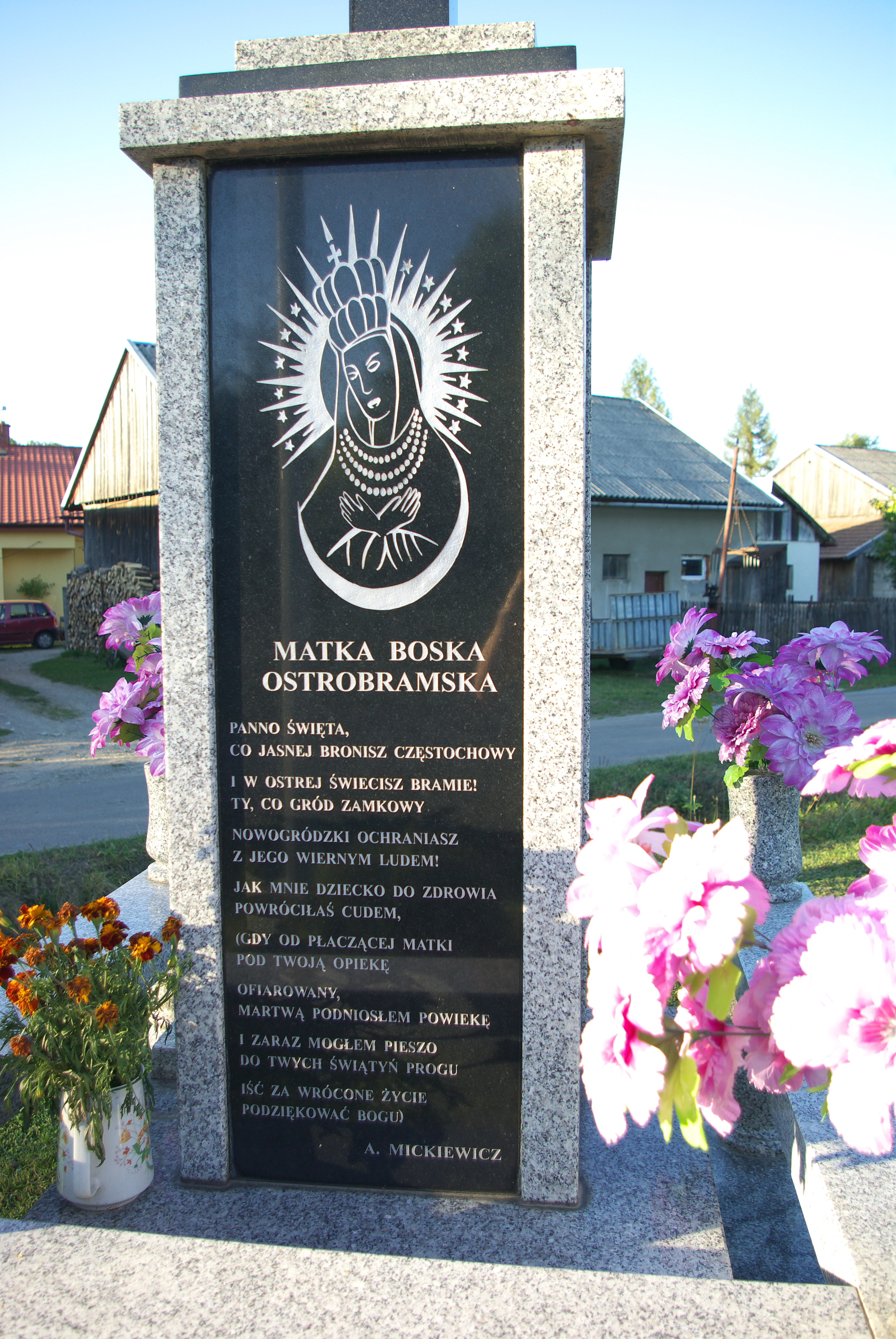
Wayside cross at Bukowsko, Poland

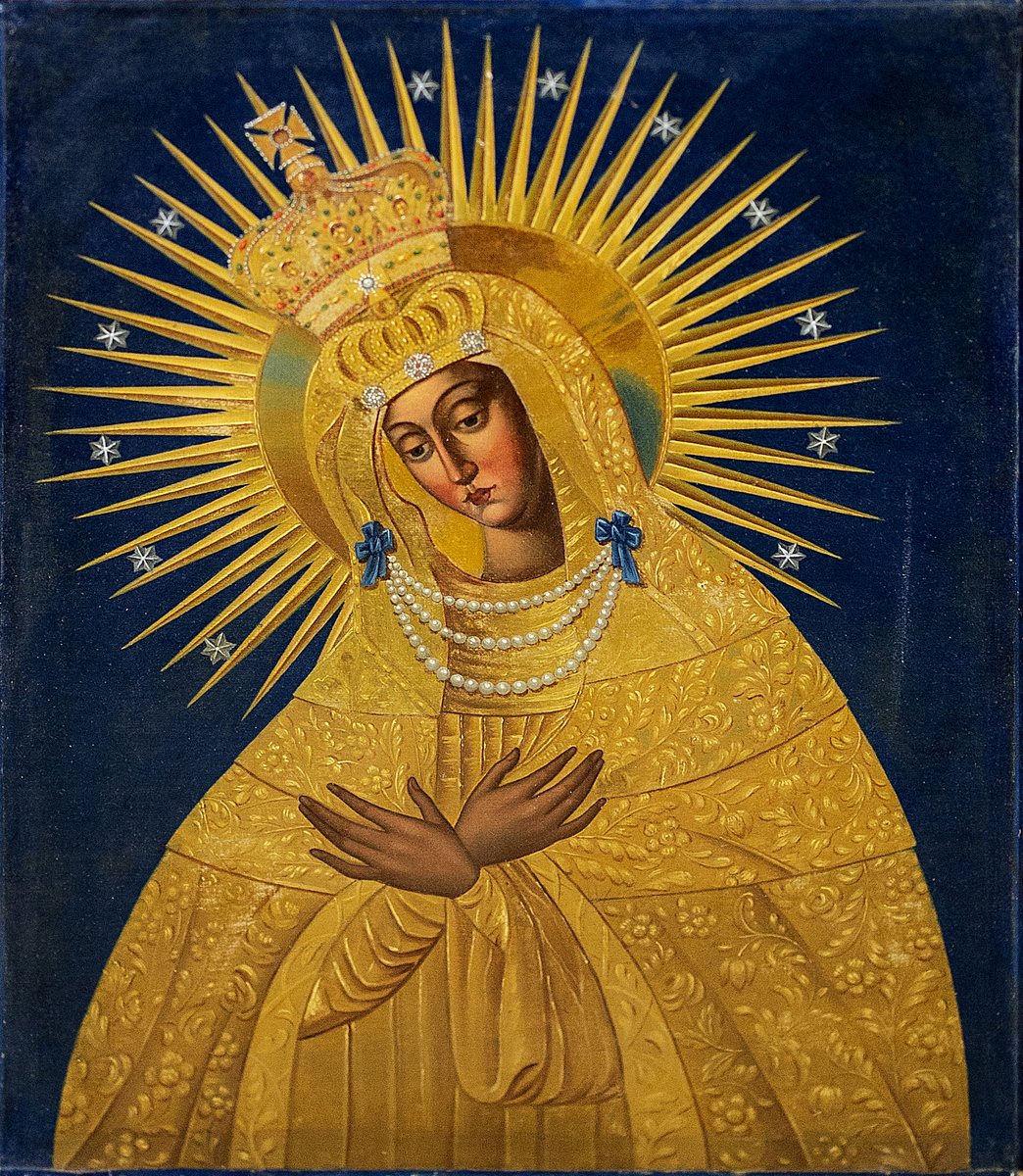
Belarusian icon

== See also ==
- Our Lady of Šiluva
