= Mateusz Cyganski =

Polish naturalist (c. 1535 – c. 1611)

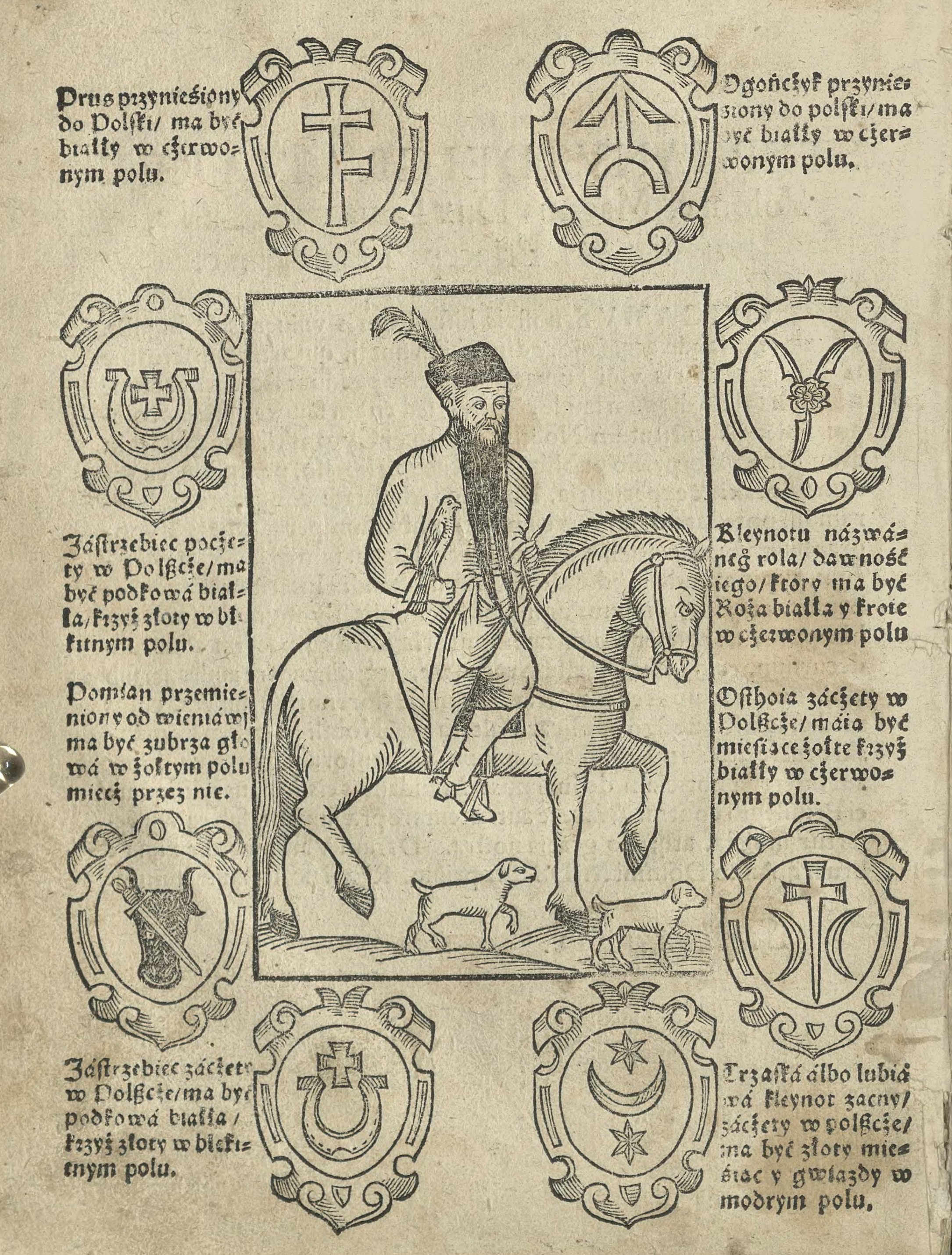
Woodcut likeness of Cyganski

Mateusz Cygański (c. 1535 – c. 1611) was a Polish naturalist who wrote a book on bird hunting, Myślistwo ptasze, in Polish in 1584 at Krakow, revealing the nature of the land, the status of birds and the methods used in bird hunting in the period. It is among the earliest printed book in Poland and the earliest known Polish work on falconry.

The name Cyganski is believed to be derived from the name of a village named Cygany in Mazovia although the exact location is unknown. More than forty villages with similar names exist. It is also possible that his surname was derived from German von Zigahnen. He was from a noble family bearing the Prus I coat of arms and probably moved from to Poland and was a friend of Stephen Báthory, to whom his book was dedicated.

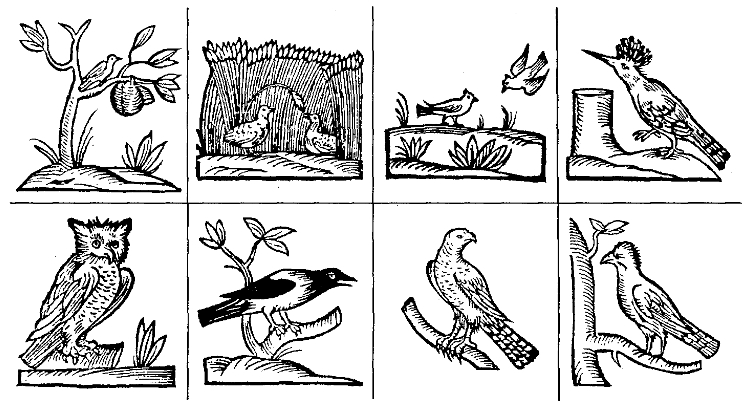
Woodcuts of birds from the book

His book on bird hunting published in 1585 and included 150 species with 79 woodcuts of birds. Some of the woodcuts are thought to have been drawn from mounted specimens, indicating the taxidermy techniques of the period. About 130 have been identifiable to species as defined in modern scientific literature. Cyganski used the term "bird peoples" to refer to species and some of the descriptions are in the form of verse.

It is thought that he may have been illiterate and that the book was written by dictation to a scribe. He described falconry techniques, noting the use of the great grey shrike (Lanius excubitor) for hunting. He indicated in the book that swallows migrated and noted that cuckoos laid eggs in the nests of other birds that raised the young. The book was published by Jakub Siebeneycher and copies were reprinted in 1840 by Kazimierz Stronczyński, in 1842 by Antoni Waga and in 1914 by Józef Rostafiński.
