= Michał Szubert =

Polish biologist and botanist (1787–1860)

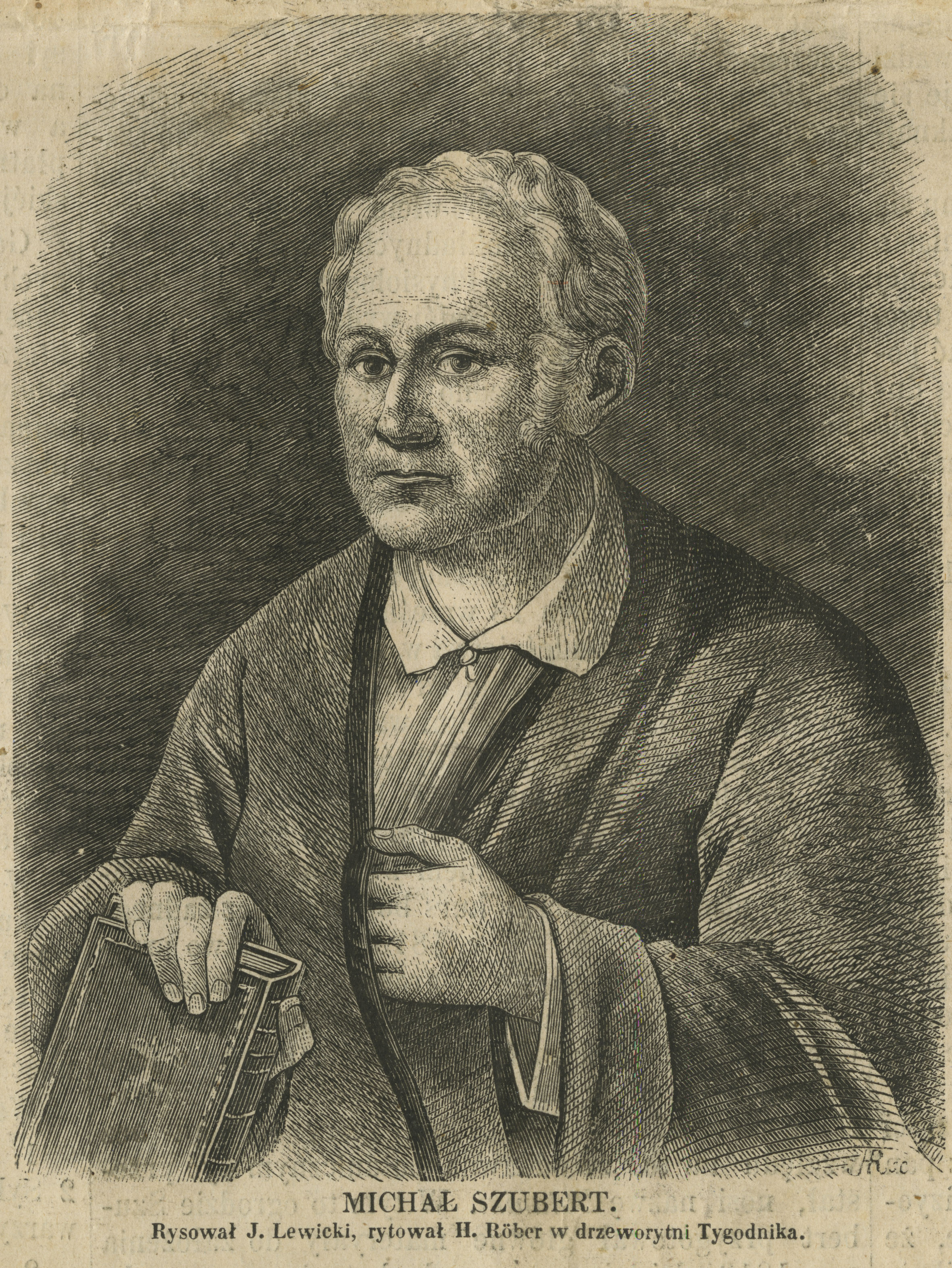

Fryderyk Michał Szubert (18 April 1787 – 5 May 1860) was a Polish biologist and botanist who served as the first director of the Botanical Garden in Warsaw. He wrote extensively on the flora of Poland.

== Life and work ==
Szubert (originally Schubert) was born in a German origin family at Ząbki near Warsaw to Bogumił who served in the court of Brühl and Joanna née Rudzka. Educated at the Warsaw Lyceum, he went to Paris in 1809 and attended the lectures of the botanists Charles-François Brisseau de Mirbel and Antoine Laurent de Jussieu. He contributed to Mirbel's Éléments de physiologie végétale et de botanique (1815). Returning to Poland in 1813 he taught botany at the Lyceum and forestry at the School of Law and Administration. In 1816, he was appointed to the newly founded University of Warsaw as a professor of botany and worked there until the university was closed in 1831 following the November Uprising. He was also in charge of the botanical garden of the palace from 1816 and in 1818 he founded a new botanical garden in the Royal Łazienki Park which he directed until 1846. He collected extensively for his herbarium while at the university and his students included Jakub Ignacy Waga and Wojciech Jastrzębowski. He served in the artillery during the November Uprising of 1830–31. From 1836 he served as a professor of botany at the Warsaw School of Pharmacy.

The tree initially named as Cupressus disticha and now known as Taxodium distichum was named Schubertia disticha in his honour but that genus name is now a synonym.

Szubert married Józefa Zofia née Szwarc (died 1878). A freemason, he was member of the Masonic lodge "Göttin von Eleusis" and honorary member of the "Temple of Minerva" lodge. He died in 1860 and was buried in Płock and the remains were moved in 1862 to the Warsaw Evangelical-Augsburg cemetery.
