= Brok, Masovian Voivodeship =

Brok
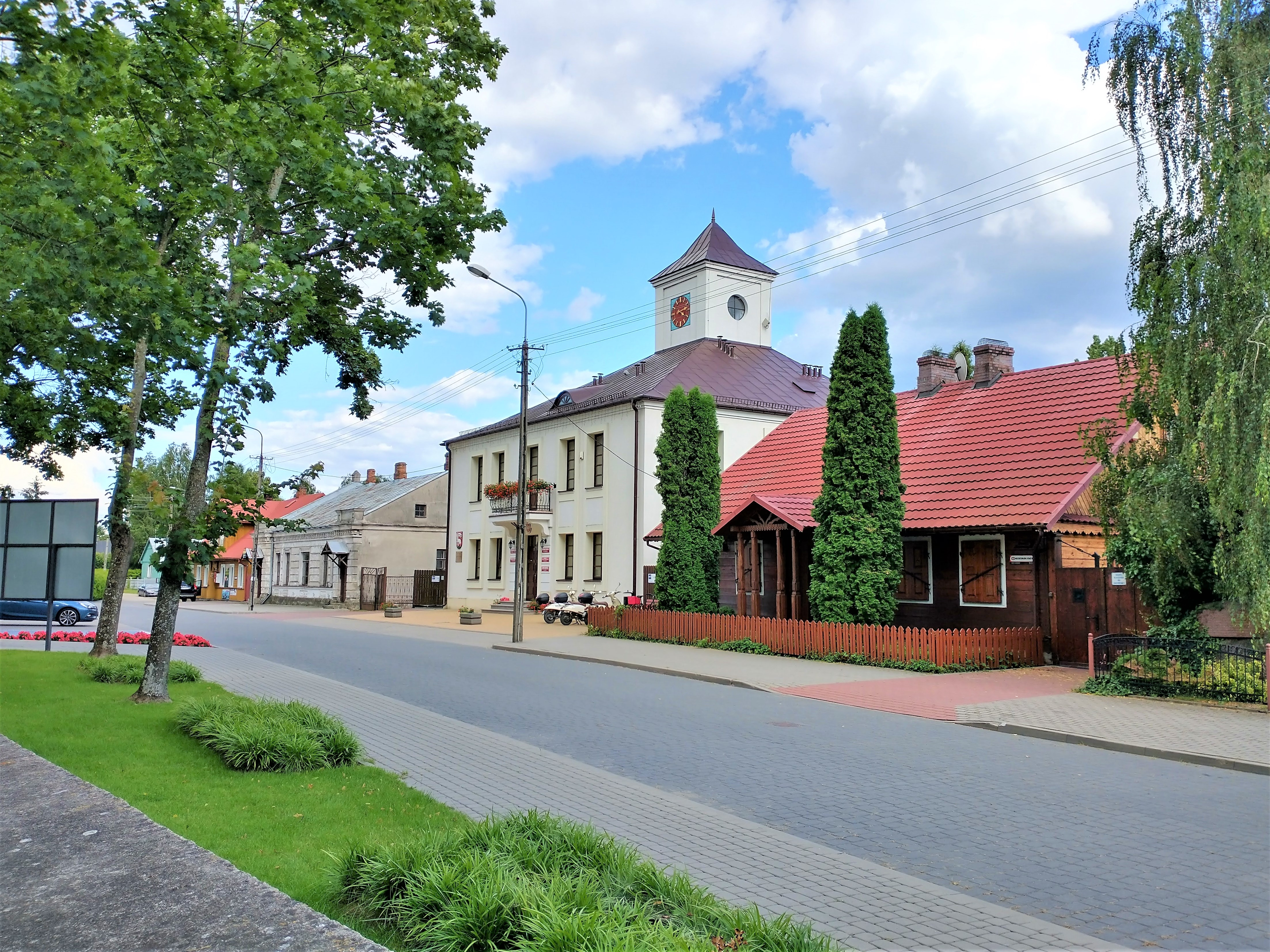
- Town center with the Town Hall and historic houses

- Coat of arms

- Location within Poland
- Coordinates: 52°42′N 21°51′E
- Country: Poland
- Voivodeship: Masovian
- County: Ostrów
- Gmina: Brok
- First mentioned: 1203
- Town rights: 1501

Government
  - Mayor: Sebastian Oczkowski

Area
  - Total: 28.05 km^{2} (10.83 sq mi)

Population (31 December 2021)
  - Total: 1,876
  - Density: 66.88/km^{2} (173.2/sq mi)
- Time zone: UTC+1 (CET)
  - Summer (DST): UTC+2 (CEST)
- Postal code: 07-306
- Area code: +48 29
- Car plates: WOR
- Website: http://www.brok.pl

Brok [brɔk] is a town in Ostrów County, Masovian Voivodeship, Poland. As of December 2021, it has a population of 1,876.

== Sights ==
The heritage sights of Brok include the Gothic-Renaissance Saint Andrew church, two preserved historic windmills, ruins of the Bishops' Castle, the town hall and various historic houses. There are also monuments to Polish statesman and leader Józef Piłsudski and to Polish naturalist and inventor, one of the fathers of ergonomics, Wojciech Jastrzębowski.

== Transport ==
Brok is located at the intersection of the Polish National road 50 and Voivodeship road 694. Additionally, the S8 highway runs nearby, northwest of the town.

== Notable people ==
- Nahum Stutchkoff (1893–1965), Yiddish-Polish and later Yiddish-American actor, author, lexicographer, and radio host

== Gallery ==
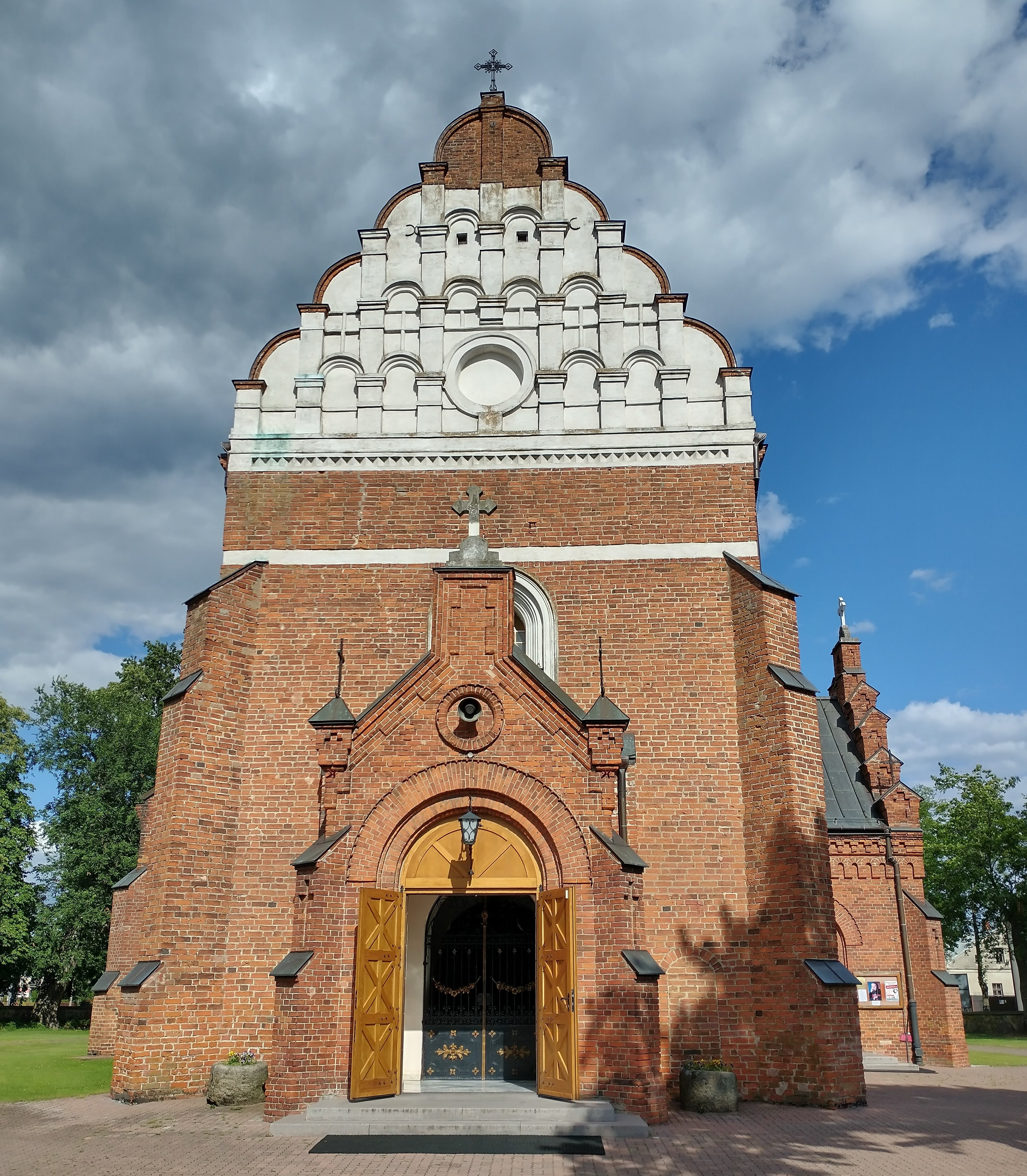
Saint Andrew church

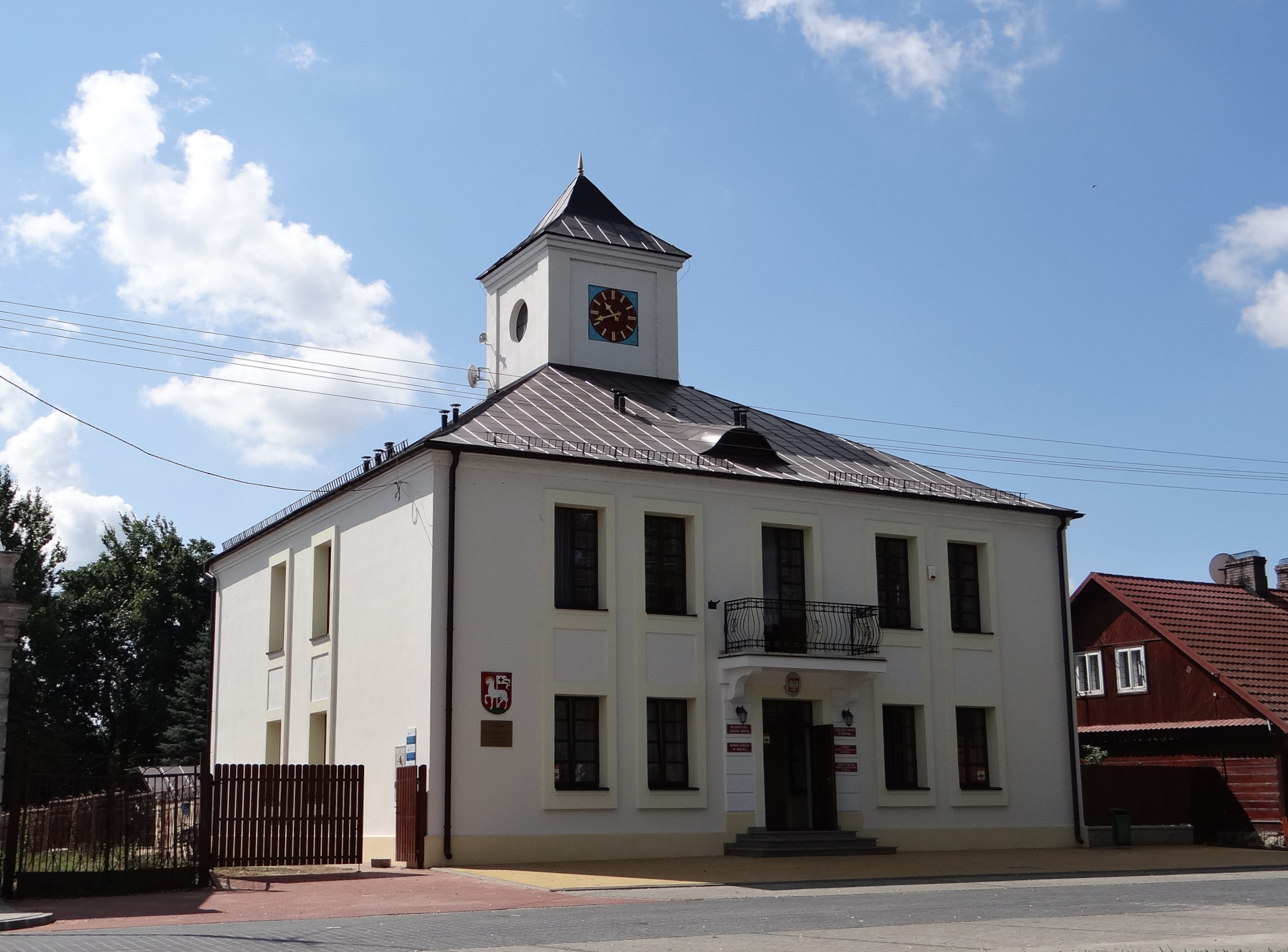
Town Hall

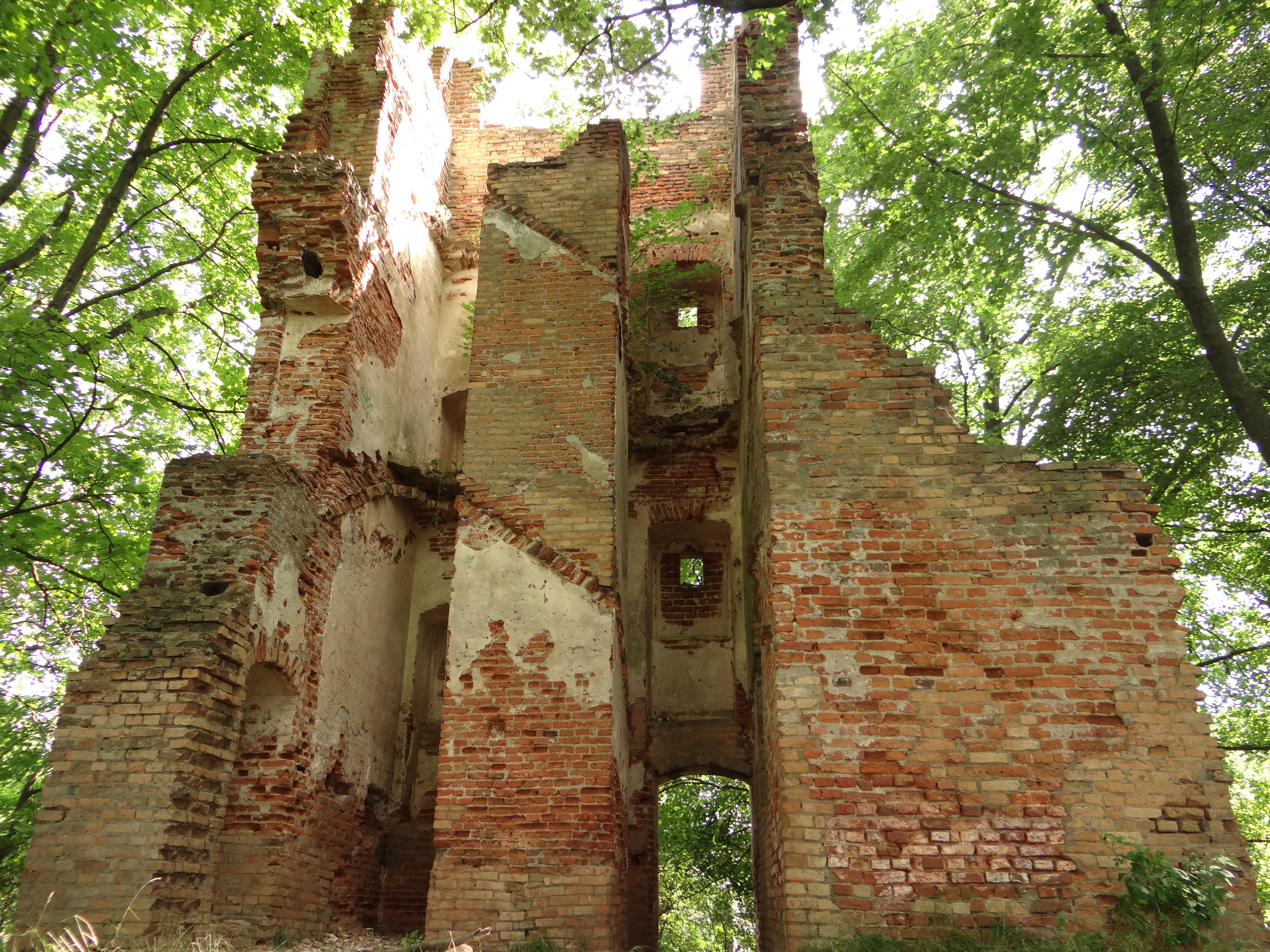
Castle ruins

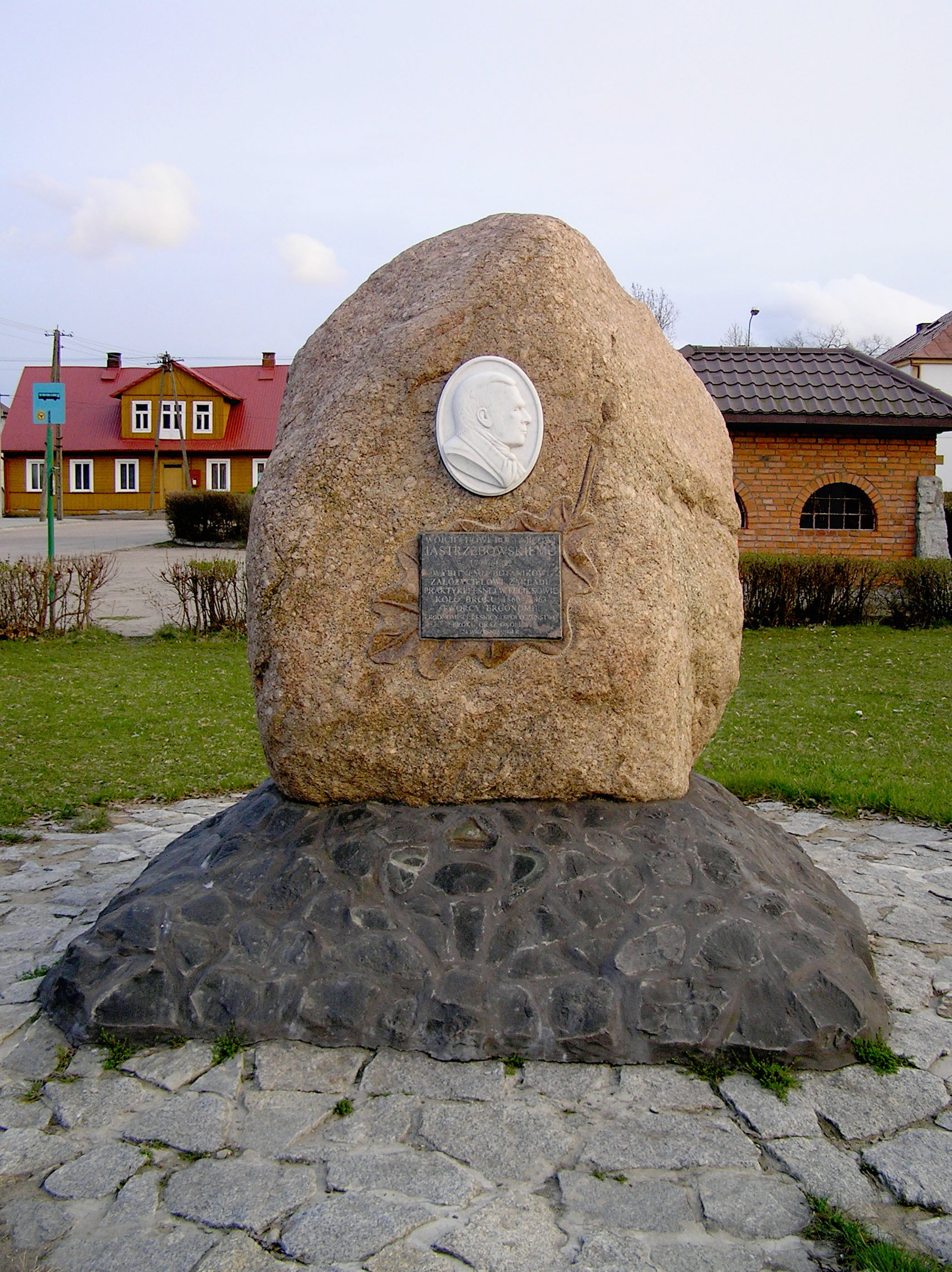
Memorial to Wojciech Jastrzębowski
