= Wojciech Jastrzębowski =

Polish biologist (1799–1882)

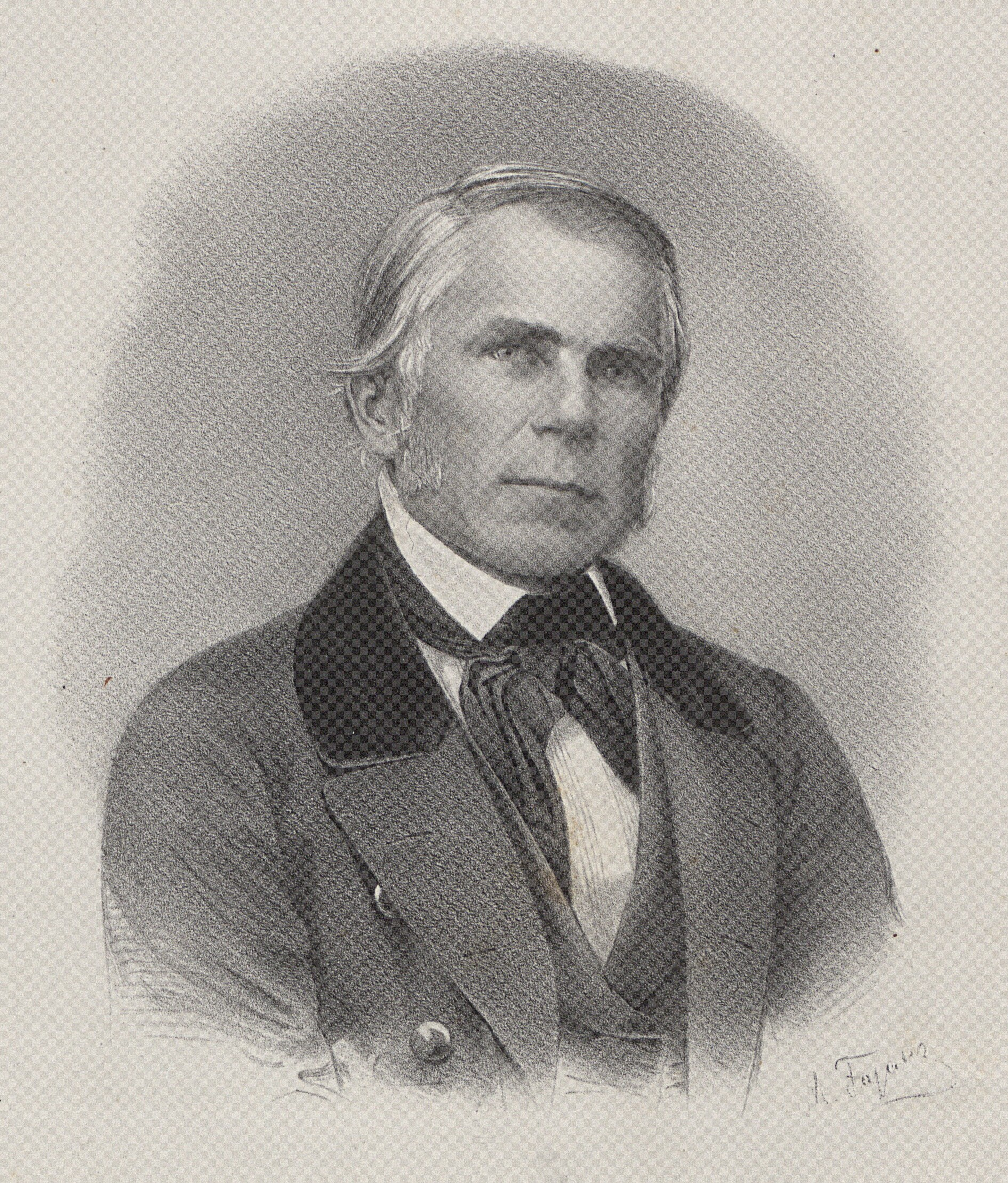
- Born: 19 April 1799; Szczepkowo-Giewarty, East Prussia, Kingdom of Prussia
- Died: 30 December 1882 (aged 83); Warsaw, Warsaw Governorate, Russian Empire
- Burial place: Powązki Cemetery, Warsaw
- Occupations: scientist, naturalist, inventor

Signature
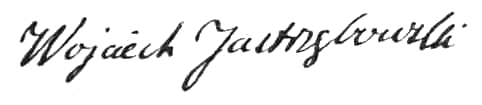

Wojciech Bogumił Jastrzębowski (Polish pronunciation: ['vɔjt͡ɕɛx jastʂɛm'bɔfski]; 19 April 1799 – 30 December 1882) was a Polish scientist, naturalist, and inventor; professor of botany, physics, zoology, and horticulture at Instytut Rolniczo-Leśny in Warsaw's Marymont district; a founder of ergonomics; and an insurgent in Poland's November 1830 Uprising.

In 1831 he framed the first proposal of a constitution for a European union.

== Life ==
Wojciech Jastrzębowski was born in Szczepkowo-Giewarty, Janowo parish, near Mława, on 19 April 1799. He was a member of a Polish noble (szlachta) family – originally from the village of Janowiec-Jastrząbki in Janowiec Kościelny, in Pobożany parish – bearing the Pobóg coat of arms.

His father, Maciej Jastrzębowski, married Marianna Leśnikowska, heiress to part of Szczepkowo-Giewarty. Soon after their wedding, he moved to his wife's estate.

Jastrzębowski passed his matura examination at the Warsaw Lyceum.

He participated in the November 1831 Uprising.

He created the sundial at the Warsaw Lyceum and "Jastrzębowski's compass", a device that allows sundials to be set in any place under any circumstances.

He was a pioneer of ergonomics.

Jastrzębowski became a member of the Warsaw Society of Friends of Learning, the Kraków Science Society, the Kielce Agricultural Society, and the Lwów Agricultural Society. He was an honorary member of the Poznań Society of Friends of Learning.

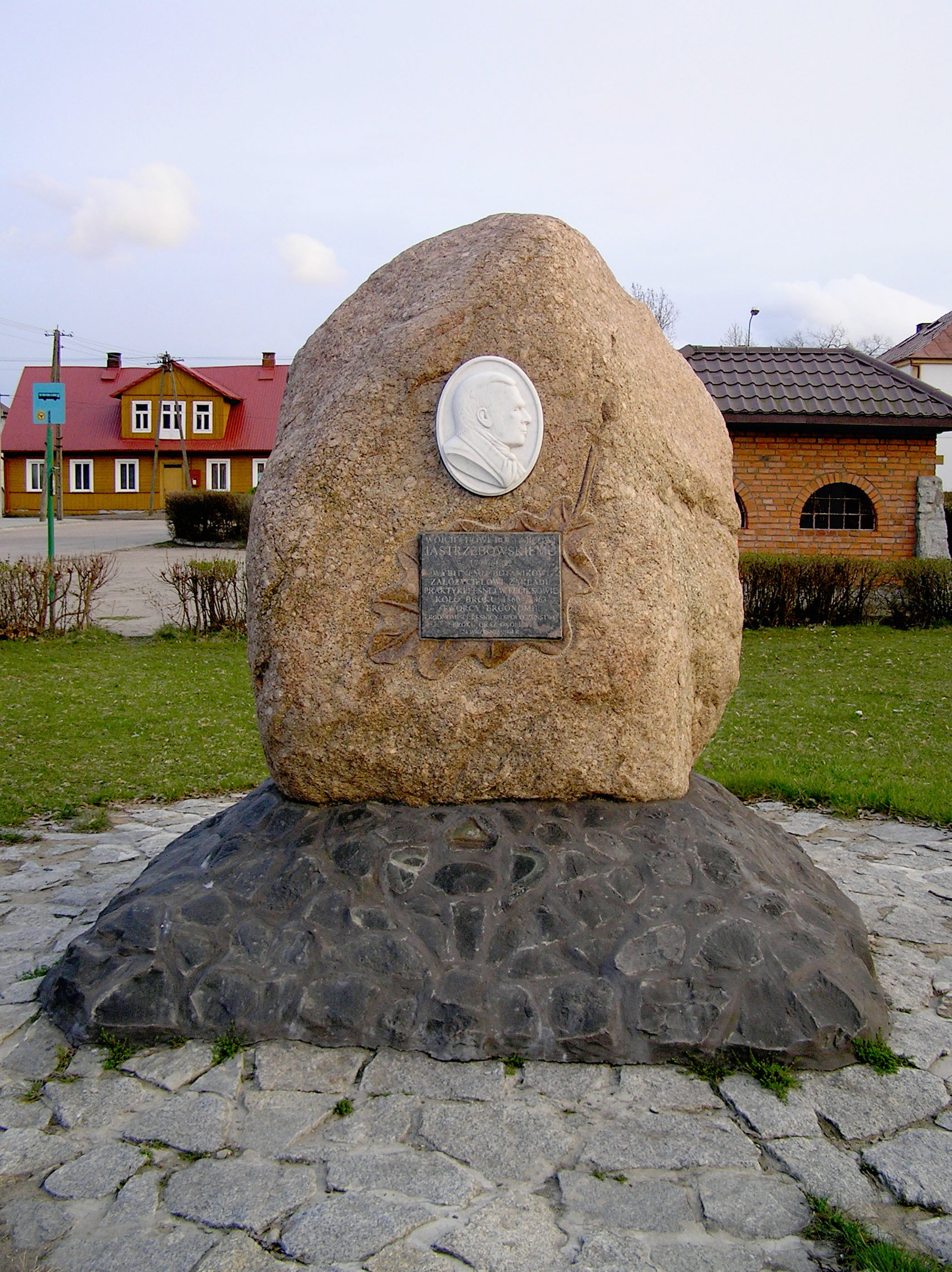
Memorial to Jastrzębowski in Brok

He created the Zakład Praktyki Leśnej, the first institution for the improvement of professional forestry and gamekeeping, in Feliksów near Brok. In 2004 a monument in Jastrzębowski's honour was erected in Brok, in Masovian Province.

Jastrzębowski married Aniela z d’Cherów and had five daughters and two sons. His grandson, also named Wojciech Jastrzębowski (1884–1963), was an artist, senator of the Second Polish Republic, and professor.

Wojciech Bogumił Jastrzębowski died in Warsaw on 30 December 1882.

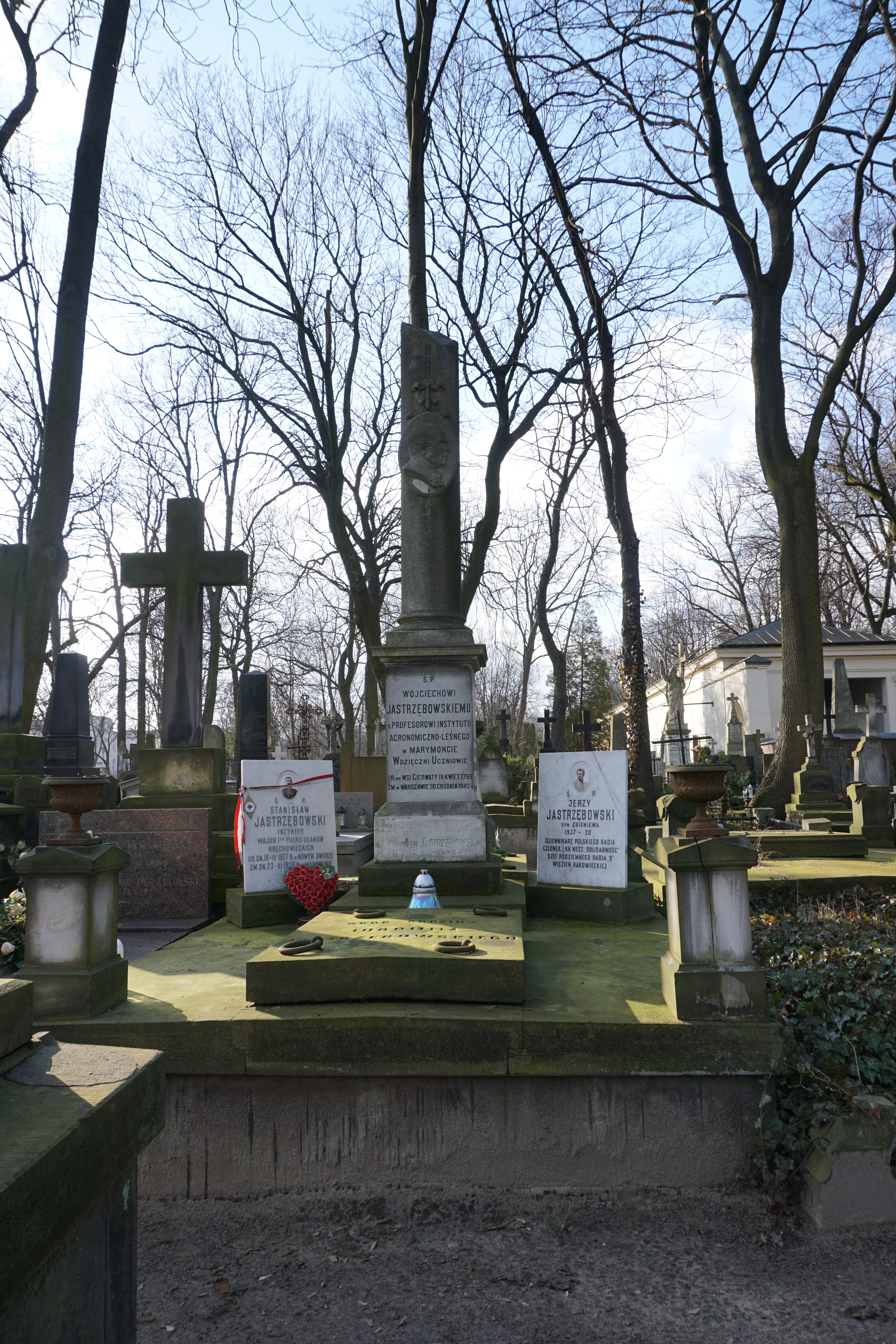
Jastrzębowski's grave, Powązki Cemetery, Warsaw

== On Lasting Peace among the Nations ==
During the 1831 Battle of Olszynka Grochowska in defense of Warsaw, during Poland's November 1830 Uprising, Jastrzębowski framed the first proposal of a constitution for a Europe united as a single republic with no internal borders, with a unified legal system, and with institutions staffed by representatives of all of Europe's peoples.

The document, titled On Lasting Peace among the Nations (O wiecznym pokoju między narodami), comprised 77 articles and was published on 3 May 1831, the 40th anniversary of Poland's Constitution of 3 May 1791, Europe's first modern national constitution and the world's second after that of the United States.

Jastrzębowski posited that all Europe's peoples should renounce their individual sovereignties and be bound by a common system of laws, and that all heads of the republic should henceforth be guardians and executors of those laws and not be referred to otherwise than as the fathers of their peoples.

== Commemorations ==
Poland's Mazowsze Province features a cycling path, named after Jastrzębowski, from Ostrów Mazowiecka to Brok.

== A few writings ==
- Traktat o Wiecznym Przymierzu Miedzy Narodami Ucywilizowanymi - Konstytucja dla Europy (A Treatise on Eternal Union among the Civilized Nations: a Constitution for Europe), 1831.
- Rys ergonomji czyli nauki o pracy, opartej na prawdach poczerpniętych z Nauki Przyrody (An Outline of Ergonomics: the Science of Work, Based on Truths Drawn from the Natural Sciences), 1857.

== See also ==
- Ergonomics
- European Union
- List of biologists
- List of Poles
