= Battle of Vilnius (1702) =

Engagement of the Great Northern War

- Part of the Great Northern War
Date	5 April 1702 (O.S.); 6 April 1702 (Swedish); 16 April 1702 (N.S.)
Location	Vilnius, Grand Duchy of Lithuania, Polish-Lithuanian Commonwealth 54°40′N 25°17′E
Result	Swedish victory

Belligerents
(Sweden) Swedish Empire	Polish-Lithuanian Commonwealth

Commanders and leaders
(Sweden) Carl Gustav Mörner	(Polish–Lithuanian Commonwealth) Ludwik Pociej

Strength
2,500–3,000 men	3,000 men

Casualties and losses
around 50 killed	around 100 killed and two artillery pieces lost

The Battle of Vilnius took place on 16 April 1702 (N.S.) in Vilnius, the capital of the Grand Duchy of Lithuania, during the Great Northern War.

== Background ==
After having seen the city early seized by the Swedish army, the Grand Notary of Lithuania, Ludwik Konstanty Pociej launched a surprise attack with 3,000 men, although some sources state as few as 2,000 and others 4,000 men. They were equally matched by the Swedes with 3,000 men under Carl Gustav Mörner stationed inside the city, although due to intense sickness it was realistically closer to 2,500. The Dala regiment alone had only 740 men prior to the battle in comparison to its original strength of 1,200.

== Battle ==
On the night of 16 April, a Polish-Lithuanian unit of about 3,000 people under the command of Ludwik Pociej attacked Vilnius The attack was repulsed and the Polish-Lithuanian army had to withdraw with a loss of 100 men killed and two cannons lost while the Swedes lost 50 men killed in the action. the battle is known for a legend, that near the Gate of Dawn the Virgin Mary came to the people's rescue and the Polish–Lithuanian forces counterattacked killing four Swedish soldiers having no losses of their own.

== Aftermath ==
The city remained in Swedish control until Mörner left it with his army in order to reinforce Charles XII in his battle against Augustus. It was later recaptured by the Swedish general Carl Gustaf Dücker in 1706.
