= Jakub Ignacy Waga =

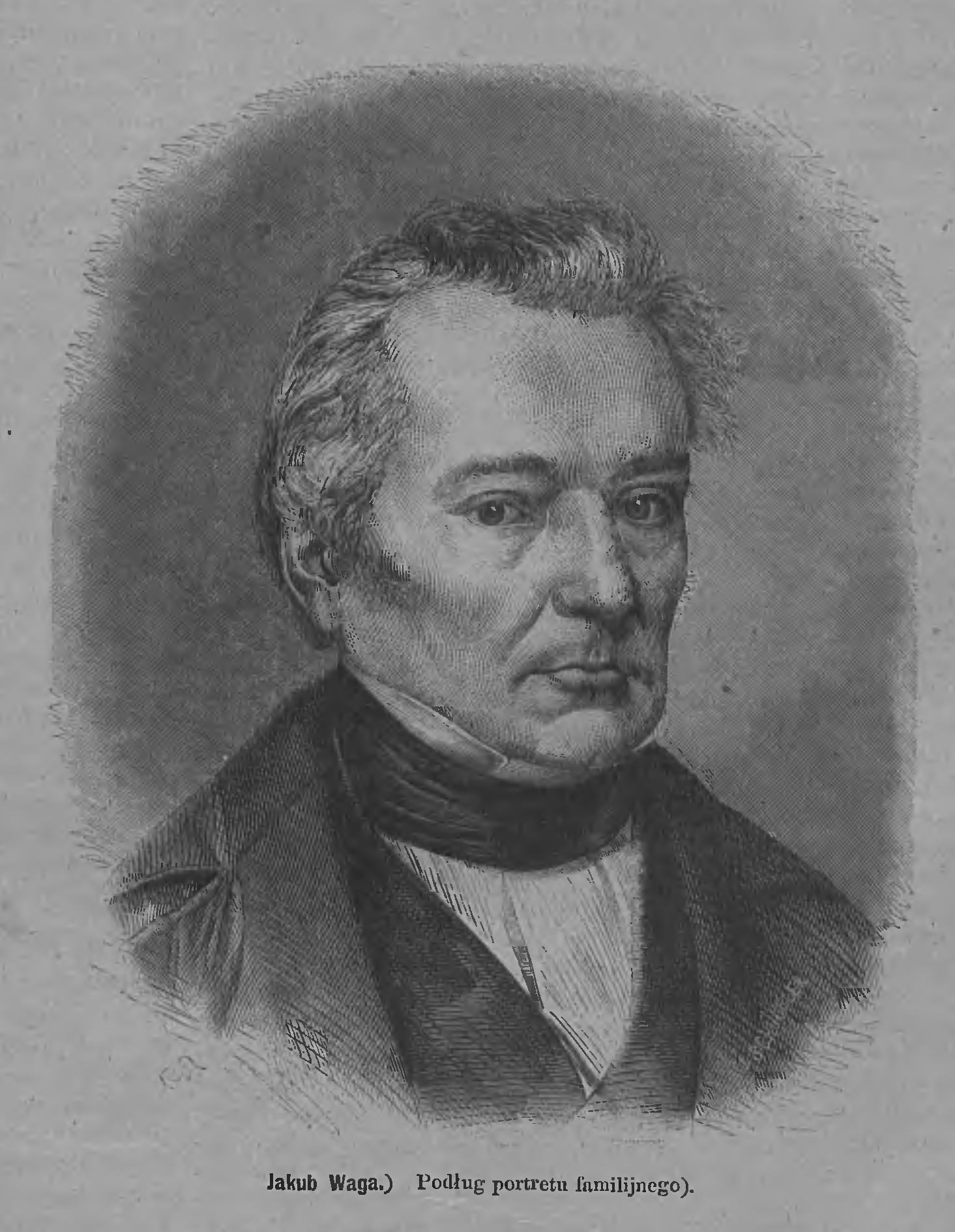

Jakub Ignacy Waga (26 July 1800 – 23 February 1872) was a Polish botanist, educator, and Piarist. Along with his brother Antoni Waga he published an early list of the plants of Poland.

== Life and work ==
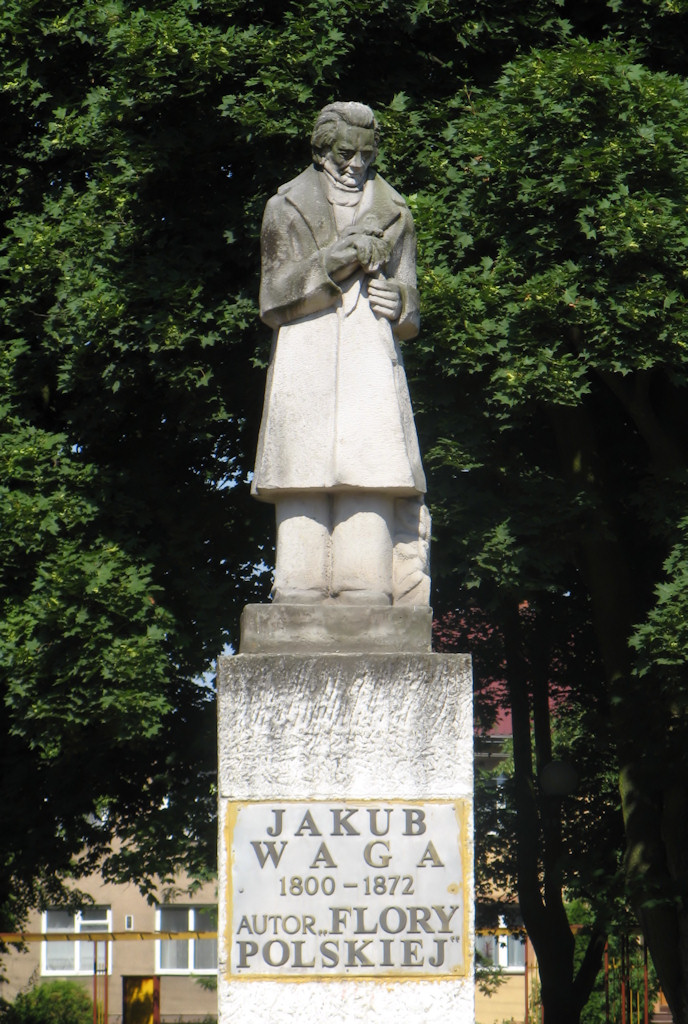
Statue of Waga in Łomża

Waga was born at Grabow near Łomża to landowner Bernard and Agata née Gutowska. Educated at Piarist schools in Szczuczyn, Łomża, and Warsaw, he became interested in plants through his teacher E. Andraszek. He then studied at the Royal University of Warsaw (1821–24) and received a master's degree in zoology under Feliks Paweł Jarocki. He also worked with Michał Szubert at the botanical garden. Waga then became a teacher at Piarist schools in Warsaw and Radom from 1825 and continued until his retirement to Łomża in 1862. While teaching in various places, he explored the plants of the regions and in 1829 took part in an expedition along with Szubert and Jastrzębowskiet which resulted in a large herbarium collection. He suffered from tuberculosis and began to work on a two volume work on the flora of Poland Flora Polska in collaboration with his brother Antoni. He married Kornelia Romanówna in 1833 and they had a daughter who died in infancy and a son who died in 1865. In 1851 he became an inspector at the Łomża gymnasium. He suffered from poor health and died at his home in Łomża. A statue of Waga was installed in the Botanical Garden in Warsaw which was destroyed in World War II and reconstructed in 1964.
