= Ludwik Pociej =

Polish noble (1664–1730)

Ludwik Konstanty Pociej
- Grand Hetman of Lithuania
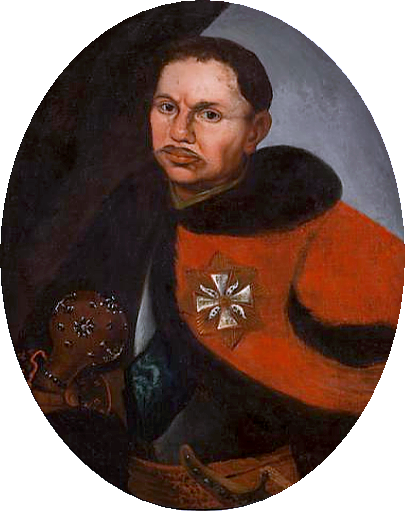
- Coat of arms: Waga
- Born: 1664; Kietaviškės, Grand Duchy of Lithuania
- Died: 3 January 1730 (aged 65–66)
- Noble family: Pociej
- Spouse: Aniela Zahorowska; Emerencjanna Warszycka
- Father: Leonard Gabriel Pociej
- Mother: Regina Ogińska

Ludwik Konstanty Pociej (Lithuanian: Liudvikas Pociejus; 1664–1730) was a Polish–Lithuanian nobleman (szlachcic), podkomorzy of Brest, podskarbi, castellan and voivode of Vilnius, Great and Field Hetman of Lithuania.
