= Bohdan Pociej =

Polish musicologist (1933–2011)

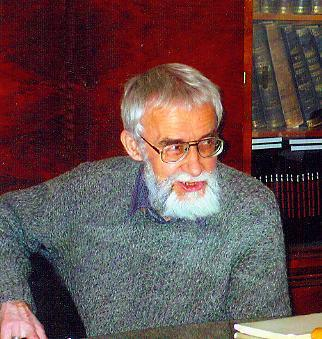
- Born: 17 January 1933; Warsaw, Poland
- Died: 3 March 2011 (aged 78); Podkowa Leśna, Poland
- Occupations: musicologist; music critic; writer

Bohdan Pociej (17 January 1933 – 3 March 2011) was a Polish musicologist and writer who studied historical parallels between music and philosophy. His work mainly focused on Baroque and Romantic music. He wrote about the phenomenology of Husserl and Ingarden, and also about hermeneutics. Pociej was the author of several documents about Bach and Mahler; he examined music's role in the cultural complex and the intellectual trends of its period.

== Life and education ==
Pociej was born in Warsaw, and received his primary and secondary education in Silesia.

In 1952, he began studies in the Department of Polish Studies at the University of Warsaw, but after a year he transferred to the newly formed Department of Musicology at the same university. In 1959 he received his Master of Arts degree for a dissertation on The Output of François Couperin (1668–1733) in Regard to His Harpsichord Pieces.

He lived in Podkowa Leśna.

== Career ==
In 1957, Pociej began writing criticism for Ruch muzyczny (The Musical Movement), a music periodical; in 1959, he became an editor there. He published in many of Poland's culture magazines, including Przegląd kulturalny (The Cultural Review), Tygodnik Powszechny (The Catholic Weekly), Nowe Książki (New Books), Więź (The Link), Znak (The Sign) and Twórczość (Creative Work).

He made several series of radio broadcasts for Polish Radio 2, focusing on classical music, culture and the arts. He was a visiting lecturer at the Music Academies in Kraków and Warsaw, and took part in academic conferences, particularly on early music and the philosophy of music.

In 1983–1985, Bohdan Pociej joined the Musicologists' Section in the Polish Composers' Union. He was also a member of the Polish Writers' Association and the Polish Philosophical Association.

== Thought ==
Bohdan Pociej studied and wrote about both in musicology and philosophy. He called the domain of his writings "historiosophy".

Pociej described analogies between the thinking of composers and philosophers, including medieval parallels between the ideas of Thomas Aquinas and the Ars Nova musical period; parallels between the monadic system of Leibniz and the polyphonic musical forms of Bach; and the analogy between the thought of Hegel and the musical creation of Beethoven. He used terms coined by Leibniz or Kant play crucial role to explain the metaphysics of music. This combination of the philosophical and musical systems of one time period is demonstrated in his book Jan Sebastian Bach – muzyka i wielkość (Johann Sebastian Bach – Music and Greatness).
In his books, Mahler and Romantyzm bez granic (Romanticism without borders), Pociej described three stages of musical imagination in the Romantic composers: musical craftsmanship, emotionality, and “pure inwardness revealed in music” (expression of objective feelings so that they are experienced spiritually by the listener). The attainment of this third stage he asserted to be rare, appearing in the works of (Schubert, Mahler and Bruckner).

In 2003, an M.A. dissertation about Bohdan Pociej's musical writing was submitted at the Department of Musicology, University of Warsaw.

== Works ==
- Klawesyniści francuscy (French harpsichord players), PWM, Kraków 1969
- Jan Sebastian Bach – muzyka i wielkość (Johann Sebastian Bach – Music and Greatness) PWM, Kraków 1972
- Lutosławski a wartość muzyki (Lutosławski and the value of music), PWM, Kraków 1976
- Szkice z późnego romantyzmu, (Sketches on late Romanticism) PWM, Kraków 1978
- Gustav Mahler, PWM, Kraków 1992
- Wagner, PWM, Kraków 2004
- Bycie w muzyce. Próba opisania twórczości Henryka Mikołaja Góreckiego (Being in music. An attempted description of Henryk Mikołaj Górecki's creative output), Academy of Music in Katowice 2005
- Z perspektywy muzyki. Wybór szkiców (From the perspective of music. A selection of sketches), Biblioteka "Więzi", Warszawa 2005
- Romantyzm bez granic (Romanticism without borders), Biblioteka "Więzi", Warszawa 2008

Pociej also contributed to the New Grove Dictionary of Music and Musicians.
