= Antoni Waga =

Polish zoologist and writer (1799–1890)

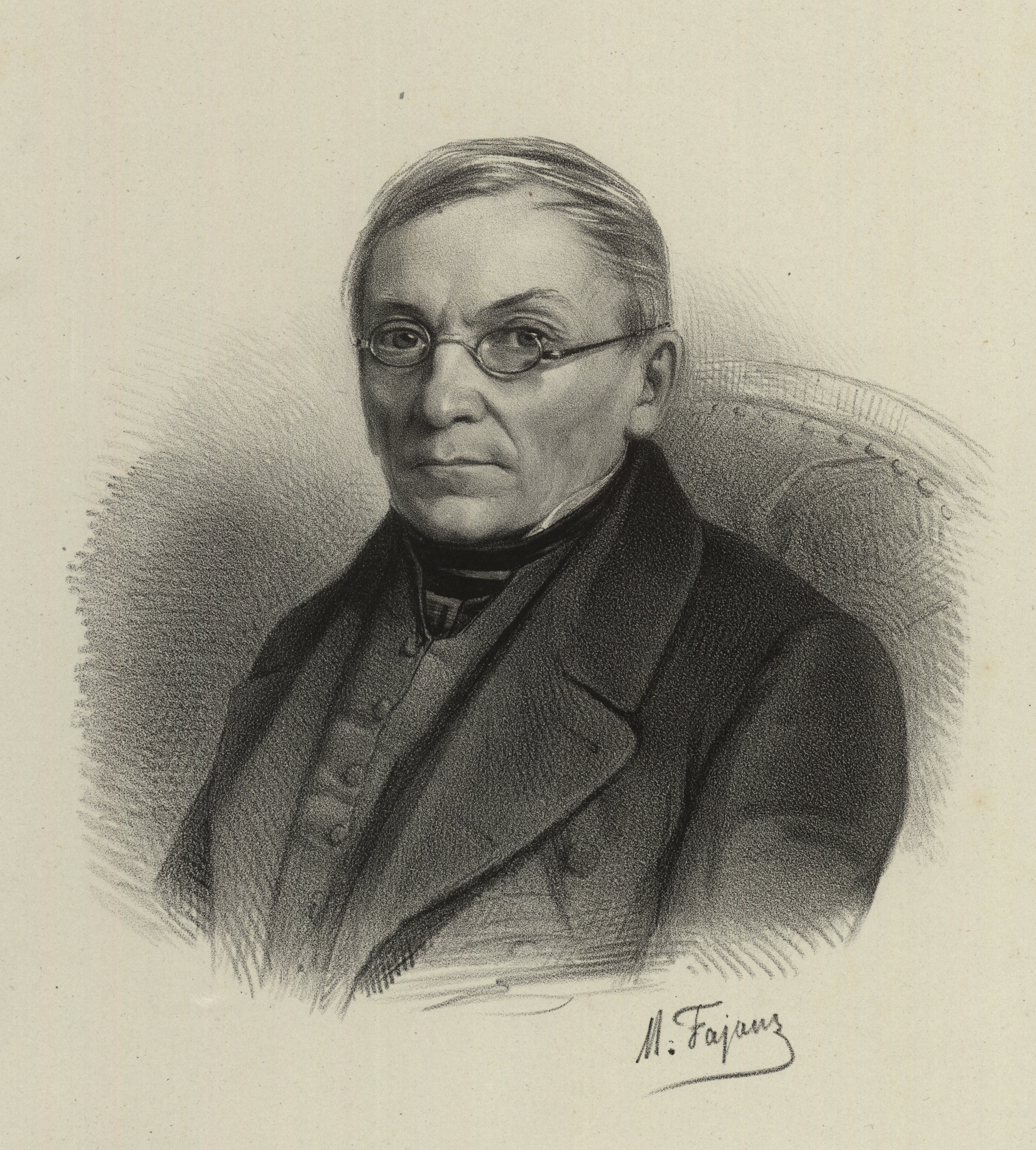

Antoni Stanisław Florian Waga (8 May 1799 – 23 November 1890) was a Polish zoologist, traveller, writer, literary critic and Piarist. He was also a collector of rare books on natural history. Along with Taczanowski and under the patronage of Konstanty Branicki, they established the zoological cabinet at the University of Warsaw.

== Life and work ==
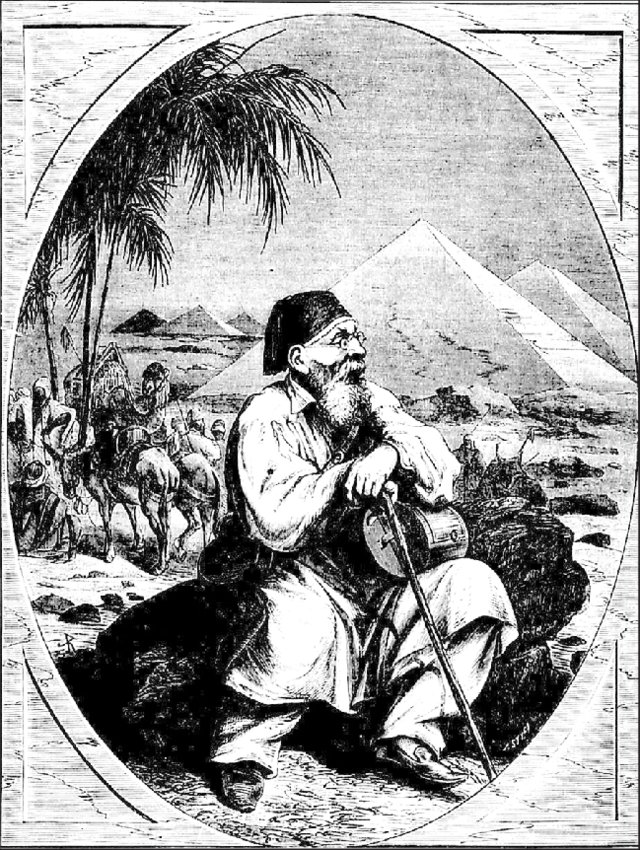
Waga in Egypt

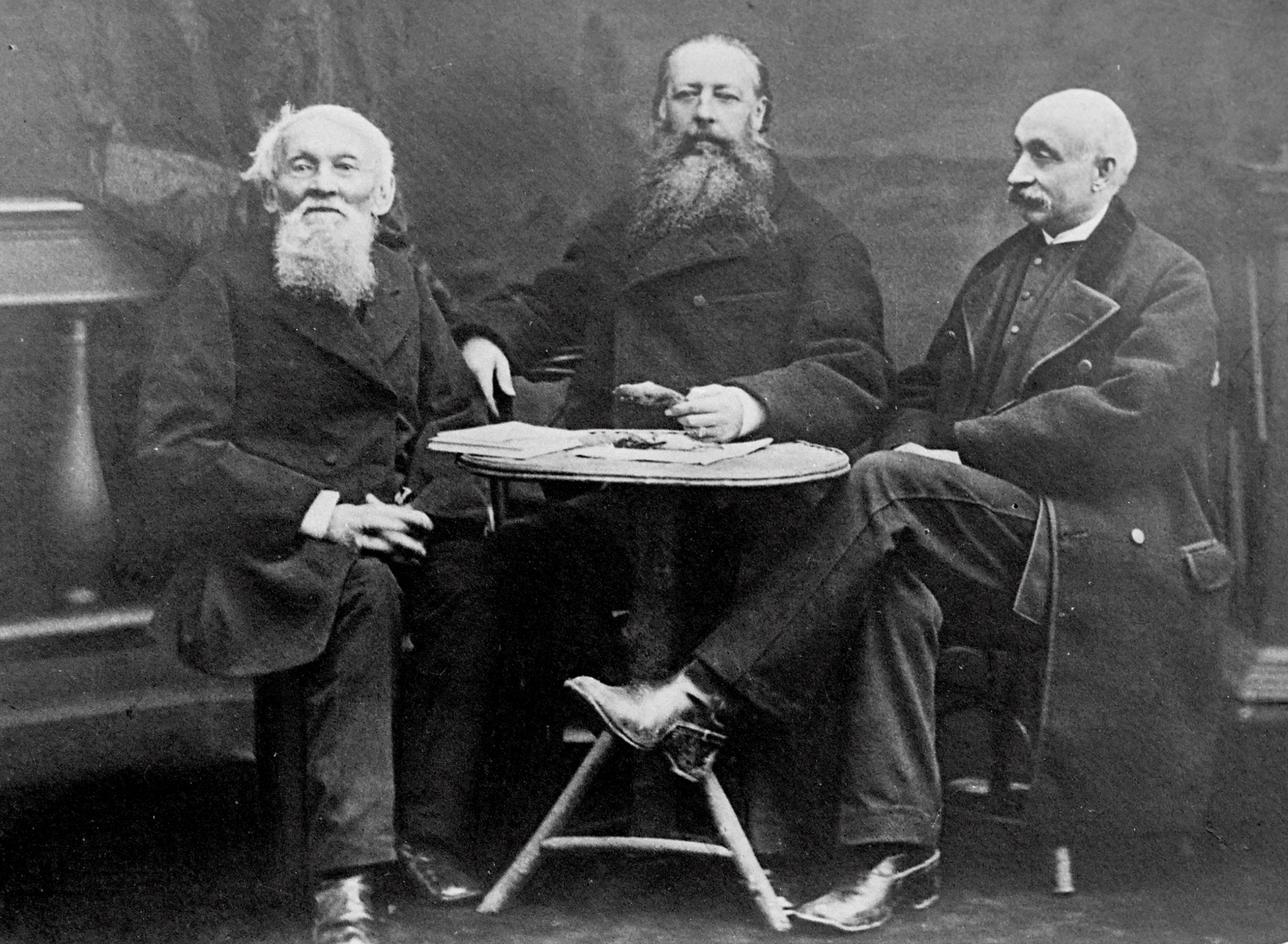
Waga, Branicki and Taczanowski

Waga was born in Grabów near Kolno to Bernard and Agata née Gutowska. The botanist Jakub Ignacy Waga was his brother. He graduated from a Warsaw school run by Piarists in 1817 and then went to the Warsaw Lyceum. From 1818 he taught Polish, natural history and other subjects at Piarist schools. In 1820 he received a scholarship for his dissertation which supported a visit to the University of Berlin, Leipzig, Wittenberg, and Königsberg. He took a special interest in ornithology. He then returned to study at the University of Warsaw from 1823 and became a professor at the Warsaw Lyceum in 1826. From 1832 he was at the Warsaw Gymnasium. Waga worked under the patronage of Aleksander and Konstanty Branicki with other collectors including Franciszek K. Nowakowski and Władysław Taczanowski, travelling on collecting expeditions to Egypt, Nubia, Sudan, and Syria between 1862 and 1867. Following his retirement, he concentrated on natural history and published extensively on the Polish invertebrate fauna. He collected rare books on natural history, which included a sixteenth-century book on bird hunting by Mateusz Cyganski which Waga republished in 1842. From 1847 he was a custodian of the Pusłowski family library. He also wrote poetry and popular texts on natural history.

Waga collected a number of arthropods and described a few springtails, earthworms, and millipedes from Poland. Among these are Achorutes bielanensis (1842) which is one of the largest springtails at 9.2 mm in length. He also described a fossil stag beetle Palaeognathus succini (1883) from Baltic amber and the salamander Salamandra caucasica in 1876. He was involved in restocking fishes. He wrote biographies of several naturalists including those of Karol Perthées, Kluk, Alojzy Rafał Estreicher and Konstanty Tyzenhauz.
