= Szczepkowo-Giewarty =

- Village
- Location within Poland
- Coordinates: 53°19′20″N 20°37′45″E
- Country: Poland
- Voivodeship: Warmian-Masurian
- County: Nidzica
- Gmina: Janowo
- Population: 60

Szczepkowo-Giewarty [ʂt͡ʂɛpˈkɔvɔ ɡʲɛˈvartɨ] is a village in the administrative district of Gmina Janowo, within Nidzica County, Warmian-Masurian Voivodeship, in northern Poland.
