= Waga coat of arms =

Polish coat of arms

Waga
- Earliest mention: unknown
- Towns: none
- Families: Abramowicz, Godelewski, Grzymała, Heeselecht, Knebel, Kołupajło, Konopacki, Konopatski, Kontrym, Korzeniewski, Korzeniowski, Kossowski, Łabuna, Micewicz, Miecewicz, Milewski, Niepokojczycki, Ochocimski, Ochociński, Patej or Patejewicz, Ryś, Sperling, Stasiulewicz, Szulc, Waga, Wertel, Wojewódzki.

Waga (Polish, 'Scales') is a Polish coat of arms. It was used by several szlachta (noble) families under the Polish–Lithuanian Commonwealth.

== Notable bearers ==
Notable bearers of this coat of arms have included:

== See also ==
- Polish heraldry
- Heraldry
- Coat of arms

== Bibliography ==
- Herbarz Polski Kaspra Niesieckiego S.J., tom IX, str. 210
