= Majewski =

Nałęcz coat of arms used by some of Majewski family

Majewski (Polish pronunciation: [majɛfski], feminine: Majewska; plural: Majewscy) is a surname. It is derived from Polish place names such as Majewo and the Polish word for the month of May (maj). Some of them use: Brodzic, Łabędź, Nałęcz or Radwan coat of arms. It is related to surnames in several other languages.

Language	Masculine	Feminine
Polish	Majewski	Majewska
Belarusian (Romanization)	Маеўскі (Mayeuski, Majeŭski, Mayewski)	Маеўская (Mayeuskaya, Majeŭskaja)
Latvian	Majevskis	
Lithuanian	Majauskas	Majauskienė (married); Majauskaitė (unmarried)
Russian (Romanization)	Маевский (Maevsky, Mayevsky, Mayevskiy)	Маевская (Maevskaya, Mayevskaya)
Ukrainian (Romanization)	Маєвський (Maievskyi, Mayevskyy)	Маєвська (Maievska, Mayevska)

== People ==
=== Majewski, Majewska ===
- Adam Majewski (born 1973), Polish footballer
- Alicja Majewska (born 1948), Polish singer
- Andrzej Majewski (born 1966), Polish aphorist and writer
- Antje Majewski (born 1968), German painter and contemporary artist
- Arnold Majewski (1892–1942), Finnish soldier of Polish descent
- Bartosz Majewski (born 1987), Polish modern pentathlete
- Chester P. Majewski (1928–1983), American lawyer and politician
- Dustin Majewski (born 1981), American baseball outfielder
- Edmund Majewski (1910–1982), Polish footballer and manager
- Erazm Majewski (1858–1922), Polish archaeologist, biologist, sociologist, philosopher, economist, ethnographer, and novelist
- Ewa Majewska (born 1978), Polish philosopher and activist
- Ewa Thompson (born Ewa Majewska in 1937), Polish-American Slavist at Rice University
- Francisco Majewski (1939–2012), Uruguayan footballer
- Gary Majewski (born 1980), American baseball player
- Georg von Majewski (1888–1945), German general during World War II
- Hans-Martin Majewski (1911–1997), German film composer
- Helena Majewska, birth name of Helena Kirkorowa
- Helga Sonck-Majewski (1916–2015), Finnish artist
- Hilary Majewski, (1838–1892), Polish architect
- Jan Majewski (born 1973), German footballer
- Janusz Majewski (1931–2024), Polish film director
- Janusz Majewski (1940–2025), Polish fencer
- Lech Majewski (born 1953), Polish-American director and writer
- Lori Majewski, American entertainment writer
- Magdalena Majewska (born 1963), Polish journalist
- Michał Majewski (born 1987), Polish fencer
- Neil Majewski (born 1954), Australian cricketer
- Patrick Majewski (born 1979), Polish American boxer
- Pelagia Majewska (1933–1988), record-setting Polish glider pilot
- Radosław Majewski (born 1986), Polish footballer
- Stephanie A. Majewski (born 1981), American physicist at the University of Oregon
- Stefan Majewski (born 1956), Polish football player and manager
- Szymon Majewski (born 1967), Polish journalist and entertainer
- Tomasz Majewski (born 1981), Polish shot putter
- Val Majewski (born 1981), American baseball player
- Virginia Majewski (1907–1995), American viola and viola d’amore player
- Witold Majewski (1930–2005), Polish footballer
- Włada Majewska (1911–2011), Polish radio journalist, actress and singer
- Zofia Majewska (1907–1997), Polish neurologist and professor

== See also ==
- Majowski
- DPP v Majewski, English criminal law case
- Majewski's polydactyly syndrome, form of neonatal dwarfism
- Lenz–Majewski syndrome, skin condition
