= Thalheim =

Thalheim may refer to:

== Places ==
=== Austria ===
- Thalheim, Lower Austria, cadastral community of Kapelln, Sankt Pölten-Land district, Lower Austria
- Thalheim, Styria, suburb in Pöls municipality, former Judenburg District, Styria
- Thalheim bei Wels, town in Wels-Land district, Upper Austria.

=== Germany ===
- Thalheim, Saxony, town in Erzgebirgskreis district, Saxony
- Thalheim, Saxony-Anhalt, former municipality now in Bitterfeld-Wolfen, Anhalt-Bitterfeld district, Saxony-Anhalt
- Thalheim (Hesse), constituent community of Dornburg, Hesse, Limburg-Weilburg district, Hesse
- Thalheim (Oschatz), townland of Oschatz, Nordsachsen district, Saxony
- Thalheim, former name of Fraunberg, Bavaria, Erding district, Bavaria
- Thalheim (Sigmaringen), village in Leibertingen municipality, Sigmaringen district, Baden-Württemberg

=== Poland ===
- Thalheim (1938–45) German name for Dziurdziewo, village in Nidzica County, Warmian-Masurian Voivodeship

=== Romania ===
- Thalheim, German name for Daia village of Roșia, Sibiu, commune in Sibiu County

=== Switzerland ===
- Thalheim, Aargau, municipality in Brugg district, Aargau
- Thalheim an der Thur, municipality in Andelfingen district, Zürich

== People ==
- Barbara Thalheim (born 1947), German singer and songwriter
- Bernhard Thalheim (born 1952), German computer scientist
- Hans-Günther Thalheim (1924–2018), German linguist and writer
- Robert Thalheim (born 1974), German stage and film director and screenwriter

== Other ==
- "Thalheim", song on 1999 album Dead Bees on a Cake by David Sylvian

== See also ==
- Talheim (disambiguation)
