= Bartki =

Bartki may refer to the following places:

- Bartki, Podlaskie Voivodeship (north-east Poland)
- Bartki, Braniewo County in Warmian-Masurian Voivodeship (north Poland)
- Bartki, Nidzica County in Warmian-Masurian Voivodeship (north Poland)
- Bartki, Olecko County in Warmian-Masurian Voivodeship (north Poland)
- Bartki, Ostróda County in Warmian-Masurian Voivodeship (north Poland)
