= Majowski =

Majowski, feminine: Majowska is a Polish surname. Notable people with the surname include:

- Edmund Majowski (1910–1982), Polish footballer and coach
- Markus Majowski (born 1964), German actor and comedian
- Marta Majowska (1911–2001), Polish Gymnast

== See also ==
- Majewski
- Majkowski
- Majauskas
