= Sławka =

Sławka may refer to the following places in Poland:

- Sławka Mała
- Sławka Wielka
