= Rogoz =

Rogoz may refer to:

== Places ==
Romania

- Rogoz, a village in Albac Commune, Alba County
- Rogoz, a village near the town of Beliu, Arad County
- Rogoz, a village in Sâmbăta Commune, Bihor County
- Rogoz, a village in the town of Târgu Lăpuș, Maramureș County
- Rogoz de Beliu, a village in Craiva Commune, Arad County

Poland

- Rogoż, Lower Silesian Voivodeship (south-west Poland)
- Rogóż, Lidzbark County, Warmian-Masurian Voivodeship (north Poland)
- Rogóż, Nidzica County, Warmian-Masurian Voivodeship (north Poland)

== People ==
- Zvonimir Rogoz (1887–1988), Croatian actor
