= Rogóż =

Rogóż may refer to the following places in Poland:

- Rogóż, Lidzbark County
- Rogóż, Nidzica County
