= Krokowo =

Krokowo may refer to the following places:

- Krokowo, Nidzica County in Warmian-Masurian Voivodeship (north Poland)
- Krokowo, Olsztyn County in Warmian-Masurian Voivodeship (north Poland)
- Krokowo, West Pomeranian Voivodeship (north-west Poland)
