= Martin Krause (mathematician) =

German mathematician

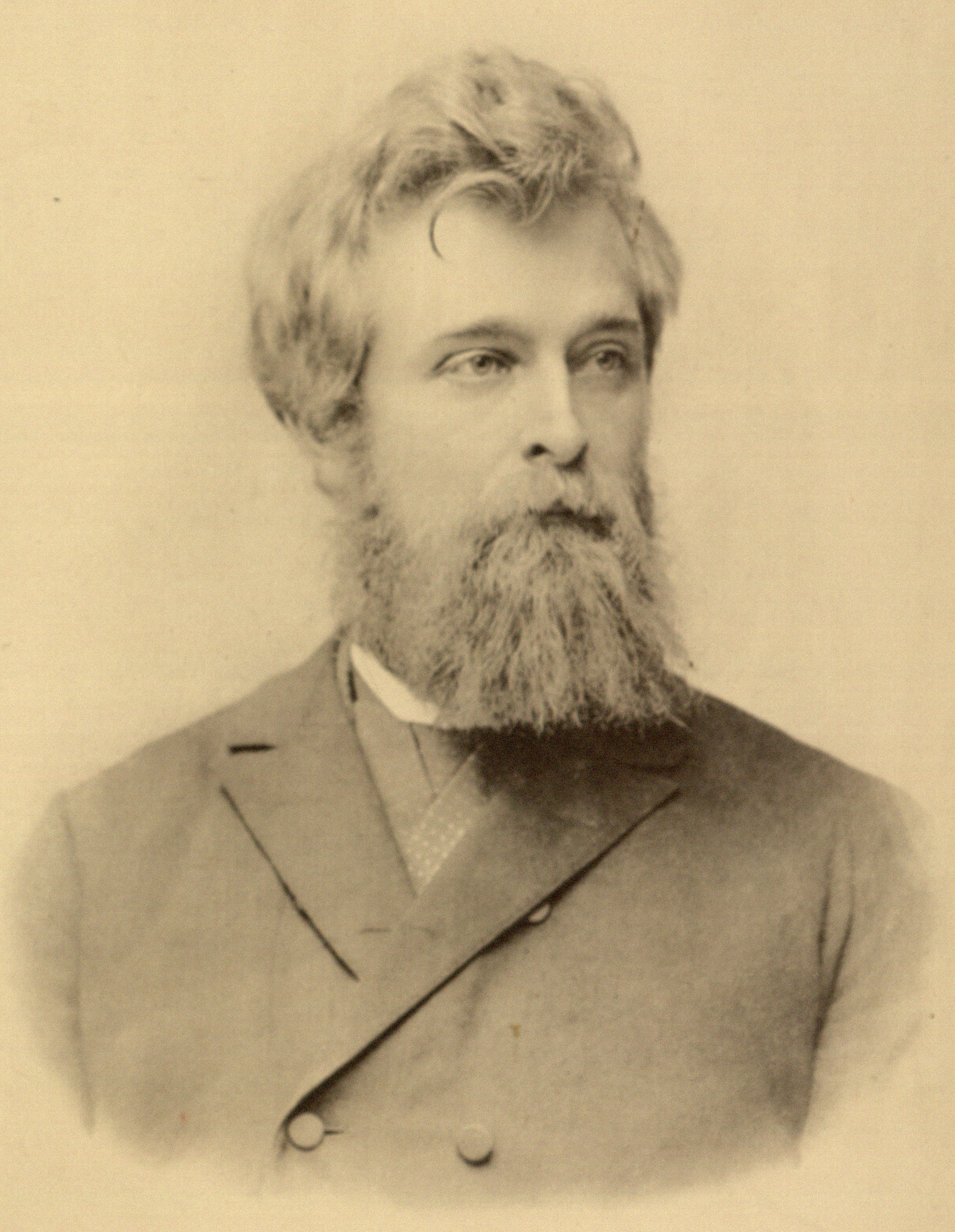
Martin Krause

Martin Johann Krause (29 June 1851 in Wilknit, East Prussia – 2 March 1920 in Dresden) was a German mathematician, specializing in analysis.

== Biography ==
Martin Krause, the son of a landowner, studied from 1870 to 1874 at the University of Königsberg, where he was taught by Friedrich Julius Richelot and Franz Ernst Neumann, and also in Heidelberg and Berlin. In 1873 Krause received his doctorate from Heidelberg University. His doctoral thesis Zur Transformation der Modulargleichungen der elliptischen Functionen (On the transformation of the modular equations of the elliptic functions) was supervised by Leo Königsberger. In 1875 Krause habilitated at Heidelberg University with thesis Über die Discriminante der Modulargleichungen der elliptischen Functionen. From 1876 to 1878 he was a Privatdozent at the University of Breslau. From 1878 to 1888 he was a professor ordinarius at the University of Rostock. In 1888 he became the successor to Axel Harnack as professor at TU Dresden in 1888. He founded the Mathematical Association there in 1903 and was awarded in 1912 the right to award TU Dresden doctorates. From 1894 to 1896 and again from 1919 to 1920 he was rector there. His son was the law professor Herbert Kraus.

Krause did research on elliptic functions. In 1909 he was president of the German Mathematical Society. He was a member of the Saxon Academy of Sciences.

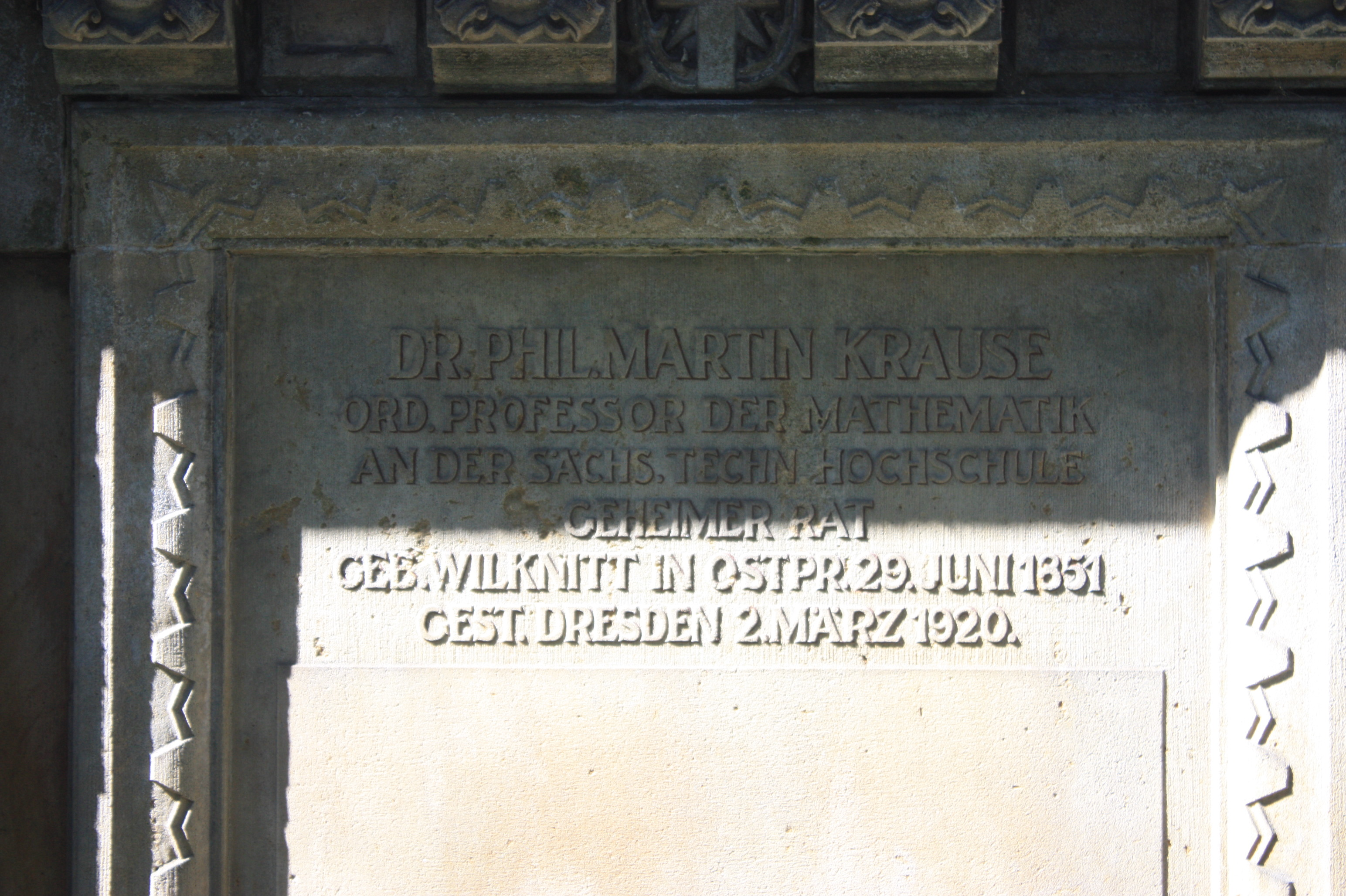
The grave of Martin Krause, Johannisfriedhof, Dresden

Upon his death in 1920 he was buried in Dresden's Johannis cemetery.

== Selected publications ==
=== Articles ===
- Krause, Martin (1900). "Ueber Systeme von Differentialgleichungen denen vierfach periodische Functionen Genüge leisten". Transactions of the American Mathematical Society. 1 (3): 287–292. doi:10.1090/S0002-9947-1900-1500537-9. ISSN 0002-9947.

=== Books ===
- Die Transformation der hyperelliptischen Funktionen erster Ordnung, Teubner, Leipzig 1886.
- Theorie der doppeltperiodischen Funktionen einer veränderlichen Größe. 2 vols. Teubner, Leipzig 1895/1897.
- Theorie der elliptischen Funktionen. Teubner, Leipzig 1912, with contribution by Emil Naetsch (1969–1946).

== See also ==
- Hardy–Krause variation
