= Milaki =

Milaki may refer to:

- Miłaki, Poland
- Milaki, Iran (disambiguation), places in Iran
