= Bruno Doehring =

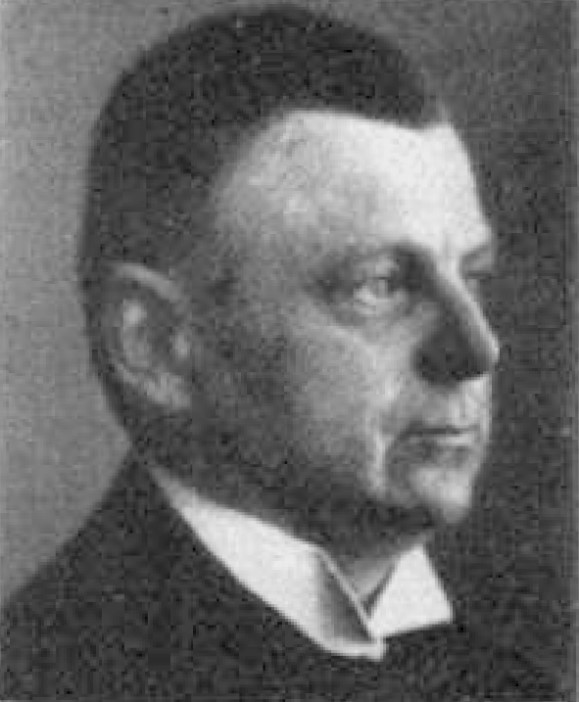
- Bruno Dohering in the 1920s
- Born: February 3, 1879; Mohrungen
- Died: April 16, 1961 (aged 82); Berlin
- Occupation: Pastor

Bruno Doehring (February 3, 1879 – April 16, 1961) was a German Lutheran pastor and theologian. A preacher at the Berlin Cathedral from 1914 to 1960, Doehring was a popular figure in the Evangelical Church of the old-Prussian Union in Berlin. He was a strict conservative and was active in the Weimar Republic as a politician.

== Life and work ==
=== Early years ===
Doehring was born the son of a farmer. After attending elementary school in Mohrungen and the Royal Grammar School in Elbing, he studied theology at the universities of Halle, Berlin and Königsberg. In 1906 Doehring was a pastor in Tiefensee in East Prussia, where he started a family and his son Johannes was born, and in 1908 he was a pastor in Fischau in West Prussia. After receiving his doctorate in 1911, Doehring gained the attention of Georg zu Dohna (1852–1912) through his involvement with Arthur Drews. Dohna hired him as a pastor in Finckenstein Palace. The conservative politician Elard von Oldenburg-Januschau belonged to Doehring's parish, and they became friends. After Dohna's death Doehring took over the management of the seminary in Wittenburg. For unexplained reasons, Kaiser Wilhelm II asked Doehring to give a sample sermon on April 1, 1914, with an eye to filling the recently vacant position of fourth chaplain at the Berlin Cathedral. After the sermon, an enthusiastic Wilhelm gave Doehring the position over competing candidate F. K. Otto Dibelius.

Doehring was known to the general public thanks to an open-air church service he gave to an audience of tens of thousands of believers on the steps of the Reichstag building on August 2, 1914, at the outbreak of the First World War. His sermon was a call to stand firmly and fearlessly together under the leadership of the Kaiser, with loyalty and with faith in God, through all the suffering that was to come. It was widely reprinted.

As a preacher, Doehring combined eloquence with education and populism, and was not afraid of "kitsch sentimentalism". He saw preaching as "always concrete, never abstract" and wanted to be like Martin Luther and never shy away from the problems of his time. The texts of his sermons were available in printed form to his audience immediately after the service, and could be bought for ten pfennig. Beginning in 1923, Doehring took on the additional position of official lecturer in practical theology at the University of Berlin.

Doehring, who had discounted the growing discontent and longing for peace during the war, was taken completely aback by the people's revolutionary riots of 1918. In his condemnation of the January strikes, Doehring spoke of betrayal and may have been the first to evoke the stab-in-the-back legend, which held that Germany lost the First World War not for military reasons but due to unpatriotic elements at home. Doehring blamed the subsequent defeat in the war and the following November Revolution and claimed that these events were caused by the decline in Germany's Christian faith and values. For him, most of the blame lay with the Catholic Church and the socialist labor movement. He envisioned a reformation along the lines of Luther's as a solution for Germany.

=== Politics ===
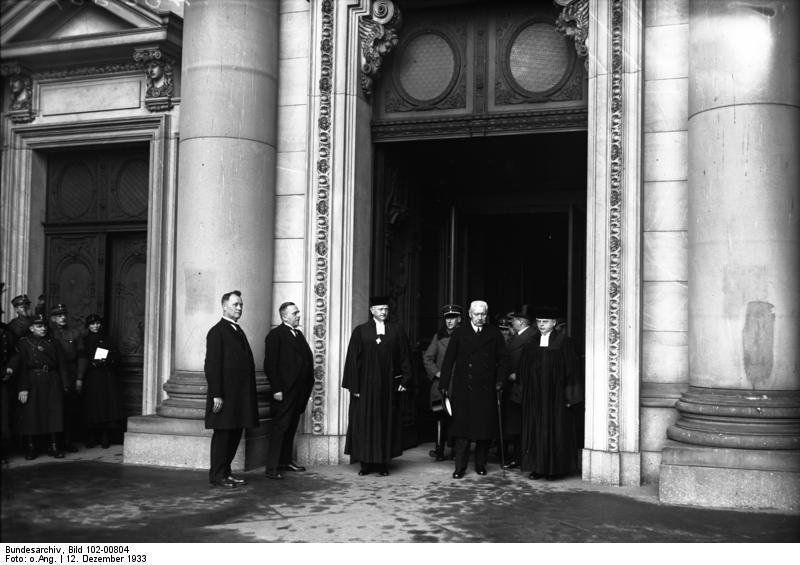
December 12, 1933 in Berlin following the church service commemorating the opening of the Reichstag. Bruno Doehring is on the right next to President Hindenburg, wearing a robe. On the left, Reich Bishop Ludwig Müller.

The Cathedral parish, largely composed of members of the Prussian bureaucracy and related members of the court, together with the status of the Berlin Cathedral as one of the state's representative places of worship, afforded Doehring the opportunity to lend his opinions unmistakable prestige in the middle of the German capital. By December 1918 Doehring had already lent his support to the German National People's Party (DNVP) in a call to vote.

Doehring criticized the November Revolution and its aftermath as a "de-Christianization" and thus a "deadening" of the political system. His daily pointed sermons were repeatedly criticized both in the democratic press and in statements of displeasure by prominent personalities. Gustav Stresemann saw in them "not ... an expression of Christian charity, but ... an increasingly frenzied aversion to dissent" and in 1924 Karl Barth called Doehring a "miserable cream puff" and a "theological buffoon".

In 1924 Doehring took over the chairmanship of the Evangelical Alliance to Preserve German-Protestant Interests (EB). His appointment to this position was not unanimously approved by the alliance's members. His insistence on uncritical attachment to the abdicated Kaiser and his rigid hostility towards the Catholic Church contributed to the increasing isolation of the Protestant church in German society, and in particular in relationship to the proletariat and to bourgeois democracy. Doehring also refused increasingly urgent prospective interdenominational political cooperation with state-preserving Catholic forces, which had been drifting towards the Center Party and the DNVP since the end of 1926. Following the withdrawal of Adolf von Harnack and Otto Baumgarten, the conflict over the direction of the EB culminated in Doehring's resignation in February 1927.

Doehring then founded the Lutherring für aktives Christentum. Under his leadership, in January 1928, it developed into the German Reformation Party, in his words "to curb the hopeless fragmentation of national forces". Its consistently anti-modern, monarchical and nationalist party program resonated little among Protestants. The German Reformation Party took part in the 1928 general elections as part of the Völkisch National Bloc, but with only 266,000 votes (just 0.87%) it was denied entry to the Reichstag. That same year, Doehring came up with the idea and screenplay for the movie Luther. In the 1930 general election, Doehring affiliated himself with the DNVP in his capacity as chairman of the Lutherrings, and won a seat in the electoral district Chemnitz-Zwickau, which he held in the following three legislative sessions, until November 1933. Doehring remained loyal to the Kaiser, visiting him in Huis Doorn and preaching there, for the last time in 1939 on the occasion of his 80th birthday.

=== The Comforter of Berlin ===
In the emerging Nazi movement Doehring saw a reprehensible attempt to create a new religion. In his 1932 paper The miscarriage of the national movement by Adolf Hitler, he repudiated "the idolatry of racism, anti-Semitism, and the manipulation of the masses." Doehring, along with a minority of the Cathedral Council, voted against the holding of an SA memorial in the cathedral for SA leader Hans Maikowski and a police officer, both of whom were killed in a street battle during a parade celebrating Hitler's seizure of power. He personally denied the Nazi-affiliated German Christians use of the cathedral for their services. Nevertheless, he kept his distance from the anti-Nazi Confessing Church, preaching solitude.

Doehring's sermons were closely monitored by the Gestapo, who repeatedly questioned him about his public criticism of the Nazi regime. He did not mention Hitler in prayer, and in a May 1940 sermon which the regime had decreed should give thanks for victory he instead preached repentance. As the war progressed his sermons took on more and more of a comforting character, combining biblical criticism with thinly veiled indictment of Hitler and his party comrades. Starting in 1940-41 their printing was prevented by the state and Doehring lost his teaching position. He considered the war and its suffering to be a result of the November Revolution, which in turn had made it possible for Hitler to rise to power and sit "on the throne of Satan."

Following a bombing on May 24, 1944, the Berlin Cathedral was no longer usable for worship. Doehring first preached in the Church of St. Sophia, and then in a large catacomb-like underground vault, created under the cathedral by the cathedral parish, which was capable of seating around one thousand two hundred worshipers. After an interruption caused by the war, Doehring returned to the pulpit on September 2, 1945, with a sermon on "the savior of the world and world peace".

Due to his criticism of the government during both the Weimar and Nazi eras, Doehring had been passed over three times for the position of head chaplain of the cathedral. In the post-war era of divided Berlin, this changed. He won and held this position in Berlin's eastern sector from 1945 until his retirement in 1960, and resumed his position as a university professor at Humboldt University from 1946 to 1953. The title of head chaplain no longer had any formal meaning at this point, as Dibelius had given himself the title of Bishop of Berlin-Brandenburg and made St. Mary's Church the seat of his diocese. Doehring's seat was no longer the center of Protestant worship in Germany, nor was it as prestigious a venue for events. The occupying Allied forces, and later the government of the GDR, discouraged worship, and multiple threats to the cathedral's continued existence were posed by the GDR's city planning. The cathedral, still damaged by the war, was not repaired. Doehring preached tirelessly every Sunday in his underground vault, in which he had installed a Schuke Organ in 1946, consistently drawing an audience of a thousand worshipers. He kept his reputation as the comforter of Berlin, which he had acquired during the bombing of the city, until his retirement in 1960. Four months after his death, the construction of the Berlin Wall split the Cathedral Parish, and in 1975, the demolition of his vault in the catacombs followed.

In the words of William Hüffmeier, Doehring was "in life really an individualist, a loner, unclassifiable", but with his sermons he reached more believers than any other minister in Berlin. As a gift for his 80th birthday, he was presented with a statistic showing that he had preached in front of about four million people over the course of his life.

His tomb is located in Domfriedhof II on Müllerstraße in Berlin-Wedding.

== Published works ==
- Gott, das Leben und der Tod [God, life and death], Berlin 1914.
- Eine feste Burg [A Mighty Fortress], Berlin 1914–1915.
- Die Religion des Schlachtfelds [The religion of the battlefield], Berlin 1916.
- Und wenn die Welt voll Teufel wäre [And if the world were full of devils], Berlin 1918.
- Die deutsche Volkskirche [The German People's Church], Leipzig 1920.
- Ernst von Dryander zum Gedächtnis [In memory of Ernst von Dryander], Berlin 1922.
- Vom Leben, Tod und Einigkeit [Of life, death and unity], Berlin 1924.
- Entscheidungskampf [Decisive battle], Berlin 1927.
- Luther heute [Luther today], Dom Verlag, Berlin 1928,
- Christus bei den Deutschen [Christ among the Germans], Berlin 1934.
- Wehe dem Menschen! Gedanken zur Gegenwart auf Grund Matth. 26, 24. [Woe to the man! Thoughts on the present on the basis of Matt. 26, 24], Berlin circa 1935.
- Gott mit uns! Gedanken zur Wiedereinführung der allgemeinen Wehrpflicht auf Grund Jesaias 36, 7. [God with us! Thoughts on the reintroduction of conscription due to Isaiah 36, 7], Berlin circa 1935.
- Mein Lebensweg [My life], Gütersloh 1952.
- Das Domkandidatenstift zu Berlin. Ein geschichtlicher Rückblick zur Hundertjahrfeier. Mit einem Beitrag von Ulrich Seeger: Die Aufgaben des Predigerseminars heute [The Cathedral apprentices in Berlin. A historical retrospective to mark the centenary. With a contribution by Ulrich Seeger: The duties of the Seminary today], Verlag Die Kirche, Berlin 1954.
