= Georg von Majewski =

German general in the Wehrmacht (1888–1945)

Georg Andreas Julius von Majewski
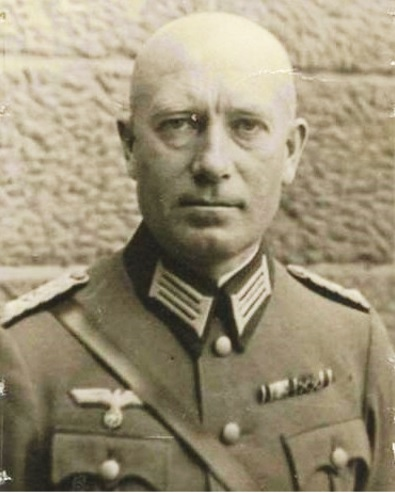
- Born: 30 November 1888; Scharnau, German Empire
- Died: 6 May 1945 (aged 56); Plzeň, Protectorate of Bohemia and Moravia
- Military career
- Allegiance: German Empire (to 1918); Weimar Republic (to 1933); Nazi Germany (to 1945)
- Branch: (German Empire) Reichsheer (Weimar Republic) Reichswehr (Nazi Germany) Wehrmacht
- Service years: 1908–1945
- Rank: Generalleutnant (Lieutenant General)
- Unit: Pionier-Bataillon Nr. 23
- Commands: Military Commander of Plzeň; Pionier Battalion No. 6
- Conflicts: World War I; Eastern Front; Mesopotamian campaign; World War II; Battle of France; Operation Barbarossa
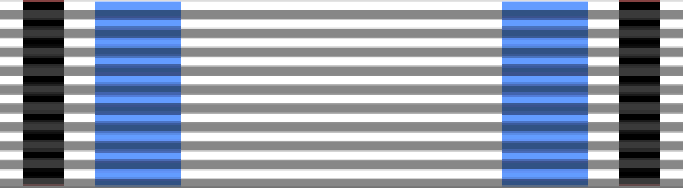
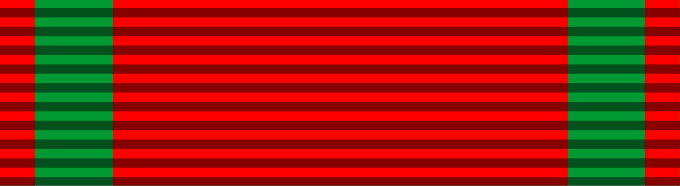
- Awards: Iron Cross (1914), 1st Class Iron Cross (1914), 2nd Class Bavarian Military Merit Order, 4th Class with Swords Gallipoli Star (Iron Crescent) Ottoman Imtiyaz Medal with Swords Ottoman Liyakat Medal with Swords War Merit Cross, 1st Class with Swords War Merit Cross, 2nd Class with Swords Anschluss Medal Honour Cross for Combatants 4 Years Service Award 12 Years Service Award 18 Years Service Award 25 Years Service Award

Signature
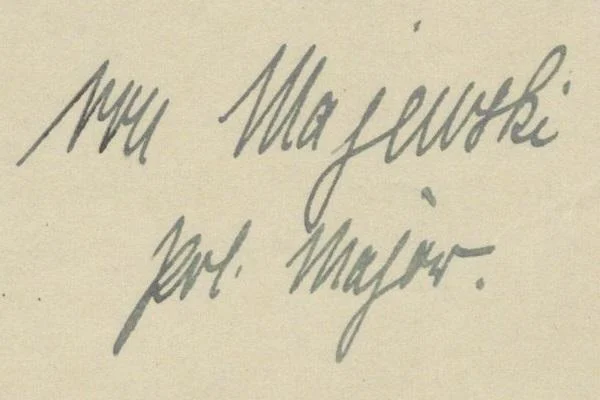

Georg Andreas Julius von Majewski (30 November 1888 – 6 May 1945) was a German general during World War II who served in both world wars and attained the rank of Generalleutnant (Lieutenant General). He is most known for his role as the final German commander of Plzeň during the closing days of the war.

== Biography ==
=== Early life and World War I ===
Majewski was born in Scharnau (modern-day Sarnowo, Poland), then part of Prussia, on 30 November 1888. He joined the Prussian Army as a Fahnenjunker in January 1908 and was assigned to Pionier-Bataillon Nr. 23 in Graudenz. He was commissioned as a Leutnant in 1910.

He trained at the Military-Technical Academy in Berlin-Charlottenburg and served as battalion adjutant at the outbreak of World War I. Majewski fought on the Eastern Front and later transferred to the Ottoman Army, where he participated in campaigns in Kurdistan and Palestine. Promoted to Hauptmann in 1917, he fell ill in 1918 and returned to Germany. He received an honorary discharge in 1919 with the character rank of Major.

=== Interwar period ===
Majewski joined the Berlin Security Police (Sicherheitspolizei) following his military discharge and was promoted to police major in 1921. He chaired the police sports committee and was later appointed commander of the Police Sports School in Spandau in 1933 after completing training in Brandenburg.

=== World War II ===
With German rearmament, Majewski returned to the army in 1935 as an Oberstleutnant and took command of Pionier-Bataillon 6 in Minden. He was later appointed chief engineering officer for VIII Army Corps and served on the staff of Army Group A during the Battle of France. He was promoted to Generalmajor in 1940.

During Operation Barbarossa, Majewski was involved in the southern campaign but was recalled due to illness. He later served at the Oberkommando der Wehrmacht (OKW) overseeing timber supply logistics. He was promoted to Generalleutnant in 1942.

In 1944, he briefly served as garrison commander of Mons, Belgium. He was then transferred to the Protectorate of Bohemia and Moravia.

==== Commander in Plzeň ====
In November 1944, Majewski became the military commander of Plzeň. On 5 May 1945, during the Prague uprising, Czech partisans attacked German positions. Majewski refused to surrender to civilians and declared he would yield only to U.S. forces.

On 6 May 1945, elements of the 16th Armored Division (United States) arrived in the city. Majewski surrendered at 16:30 to Lieutenant Colonel Percy H. Perkins Jr. He then committed suicide in his headquarters in the presence of his staff and wife, Elisabeth.

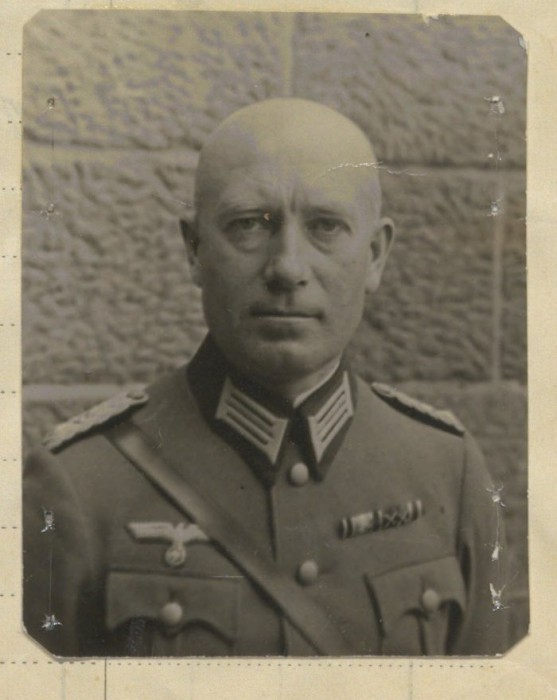
1

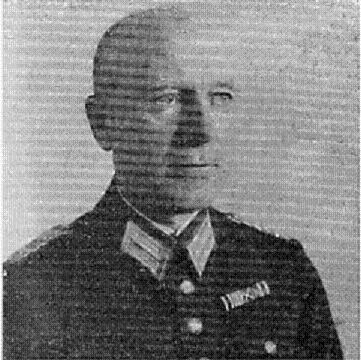
2

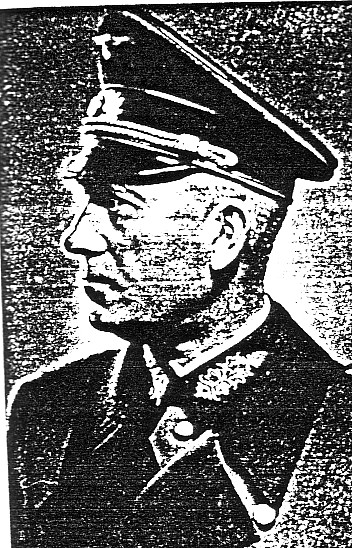
3

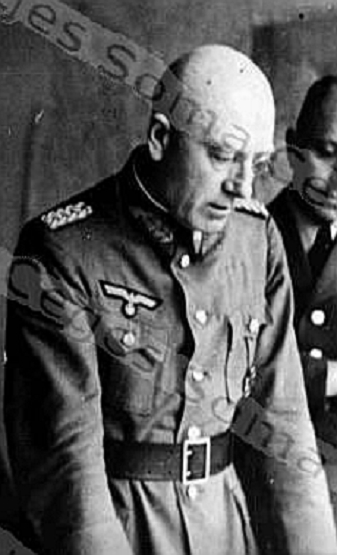
4

== Promotions ==
- Fahnenjunker – 28 January 1908
- Leutnant – 16 June 1910
- Oberleutnant – 25 February 1915
- Hauptmann – 18 October 1917
- Honorary Major – 1919
- Polizei-Hauptmann – 1919
- Polizei-Major – 1921
- Polizei-Oberstleutnant – 1 April 1933
- Oberstleutnant – 1 October 1935
- Oberst – 1 April 1936
- Generalmajor – 1 April 1940
- Generalleutnant – 1 December 1942

== Awards ==
- Iron Cross (1914), 2nd and 1st Class
- Bavarian Military Merit Order, 4th Class with Swords
- Ottoman Gallipoli Star (Iron Crescent)
- Ottoman Imtiyaz Medal with Swords
- Ottoman Liyakat Medal with Swords
- War Merit Cross, 1st and 2nd Class with Swords
- Anschluss Medal
- Honour Cross of the World War 1914/1918
- Wehrmacht Long Service Awards (4, 12, 18, and 25 Years)

== See also ==
- Battle of Plzeň (1945)
- Protectorate of Bohemia and Moravia

== Sources ==
- Lämmer, Hans (1993). General Georg von Majewski: Der letzte deutsche Stadtkommandant von Pilsen. Böhlau Verlag. ISBN 978-3412091305.
- Schulz, Gerhard (2001). Die Polizei im Dritten Reich. Nomos. ISBN 978-3789042937.
- Holý, Jiří (2005). Plzeň 1945. Plzeň Historical Society. ISBN 978-8086350802.
- "Generalleutnant Georg von Majewski". Axis Biographical Research.
