= Majauskas =

- Lithuanian surname
- m.: Majauskas
- f.: (unmarried): Majauskaitė
- f.: (married): Majauskienė
- f.: (short): Majauskė
- Related names: Majewski, Majowski, Mayevsky

Majauskas is a Lithuanian-language surname. Notable people with the surname include:

- Aurimas Majauskas
- Gustavo Majauskas
- Mykolas Majauskas
