= Przebędowo, Warmian-Masurian Voivodeship =

Przebędowo
- Village
- Location within Poland
- Coordinates: 54°19′18″N 20°10′58″E
- Country: Poland
- Voivodeship: Warmian-Masurian
- County: Braniewo
- Gmina: Lelkowo
- Population: 60

Przebędowo [pʂɛbɛnˈdɔvɔ] is a village in the administrative district of Gmina Lelkowo, within Braniewo County, Warmian-Masurian Voivodeship, in northern Poland, close to the border with the Kaliningrad Oblast of Russia.
