= Zabłocie Kozłowskie =

- Village
- Location within Poland
- Coordinates: 53°18′41″N 20°13′52″E
- Country: Poland
- Voivodeship: Warmian-Masurian
- County: Nidzica
- Gmina: Kozłowo
- Population: 50

Zabłocie Kozłowskie [zaˈbwɔt͡ɕɛ kɔˈzwɔfskʲɛ] is a village in the administrative district of Gmina Kozłowo, within Nidzica County, Warmian-Masurian Voivodeship, in northern Poland.
