= Zakrzewko, Warmian-Masurian Voivodeship =

Zakrzewko
- Village
- Location within Poland
- Coordinates: 53°16′N 20°19′E
- Country: Poland
- Voivodeship: Warmian-Masurian
- County: Nidzica
- Gmina: Kozłowo
- Population: 50

Zakrzewko [zaˈkʂɛfkɔ] is a village in the administrative district of Gmina Kozłowo, within Nidzica County, Warmian-Masurian Voivodeship, in northern Poland.
