= Kozłowo, Nidzica County =

Kozłowo
- Village
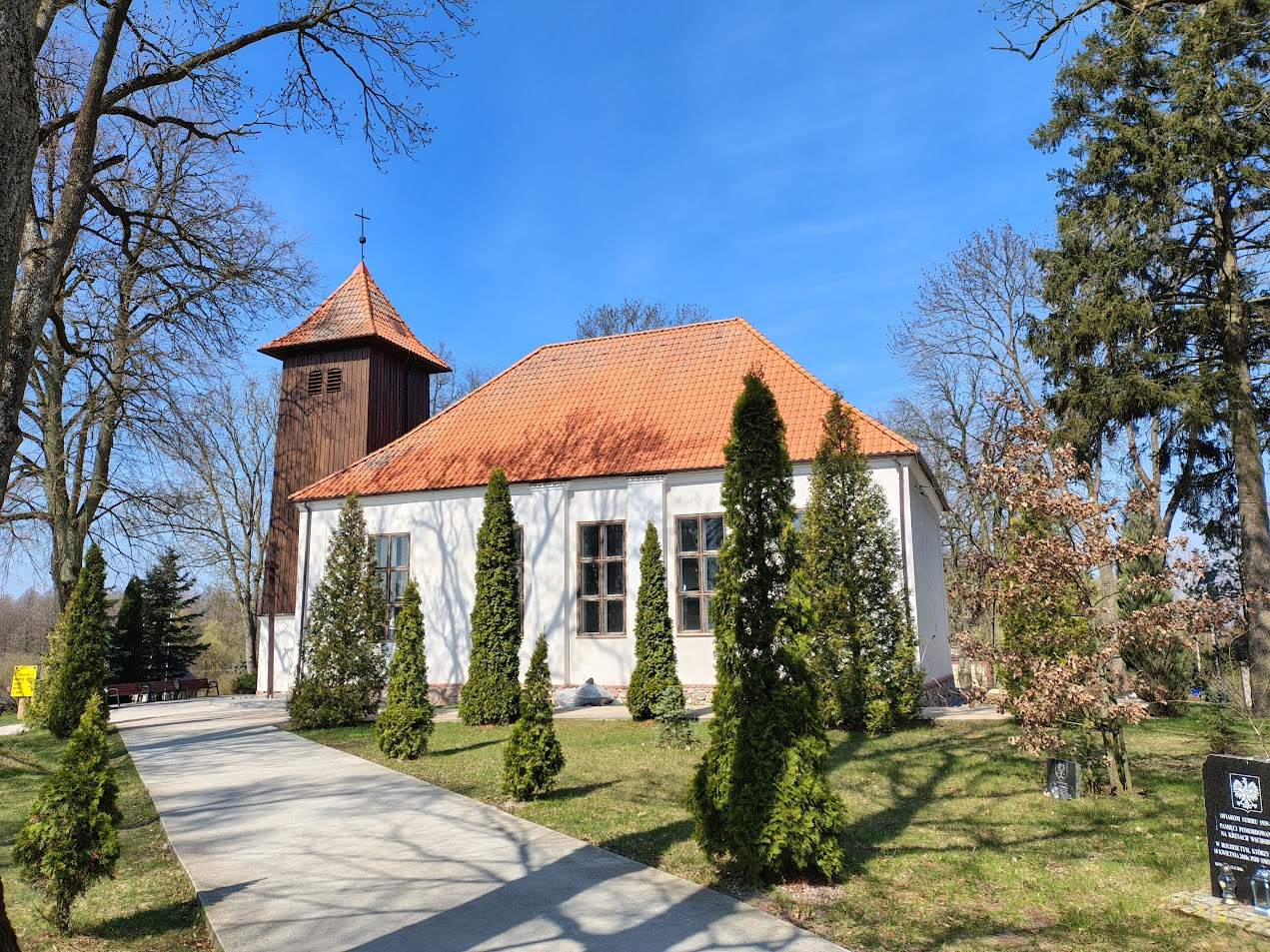
- Saints Peter and Paul the Apostles church in Kozłowo

- Location within Poland
- Coordinates: 53°18′24″N 20°17′16″E
- Country: Poland
- Voivodeship: Warmian-Masurian
- County: Nidzica
- Gmina: Kozłowo

Population
  - Total: 3,000
- Time zone: UTC+1 (CET)
  - Summer (DST): UTC+2 (CEST)
- Vehicle registration: NNI

Kozłowo [kɔˈzwɔvɔ] is a village in Nidzica County, Warmian-Masurian Voivodeship, in northern Poland. It is the seat of the gmina (administrative district) called Gmina Kozłowo.
