= Mayevsky =

Mayevsky, Mayevskaya, Maevsky is a Russian surname.

- Anna Mayevskaya, Soviet luger
- Dmitry Maevsky (1917–1992), Russian painter
- Ivan Mayevsky, Russian spelling of Ivan Mayewski (born 1988), Belarusian footballer
- Konstantin Mayevsky (born 1979), Russian futsal player
- Vladimir May-Mayevsky (1867–1920), Russian general

== See also ==
- Majewski
- Majauskas
