= Wola, Nidzica County =

Wola
- Village
- Location within Poland
- Coordinates: 53°14′N 20°21′E
- Country: Poland
- Voivodeship: Warmian-Masurian
- County: Nidzica
- Gmina: Kozłowo

Wola [ˈvɔla] is a village in the administrative district of Gmina Kozłowo, within Nidzica County, Warmian-Masurian Voivodeship, in northern Poland.
