= Ważyny =

- Village
- Location within Poland
- Coordinates: 53°19′N 20°25′E
- Country: Poland
- Voivodeship: Warmian-Masurian
- County: Nidzica
- Gmina: Kozłowo
- Population: 100

Ważyny [vaˈʐɨnɨ] is a village in the administrative district of Gmina Kozłowo, within Nidzica County, Warmian-Masurian Voivodeship, in northern Poland.
