= Jarzeński Młyn =

- Settlement
- Location within Poland
- Coordinates: 54°23′17″N 20°18′08″E
- Country: Poland
- Voivodeship: Warmian-Masurian
- County: Braniewo
- Gmina: Lelkowo

Jarzeński Młyn [jaˈʐɛɲski ˈmwɨn] is a settlement in the administrative district of Gmina Lelkowo, within Braniewo County, Warmian-Masurian Voivodeship, in northern Poland, close to the border with the Kaliningrad Oblast of Russia.
