= Albrecht Konrad Finck von Finckenstein =

German politician

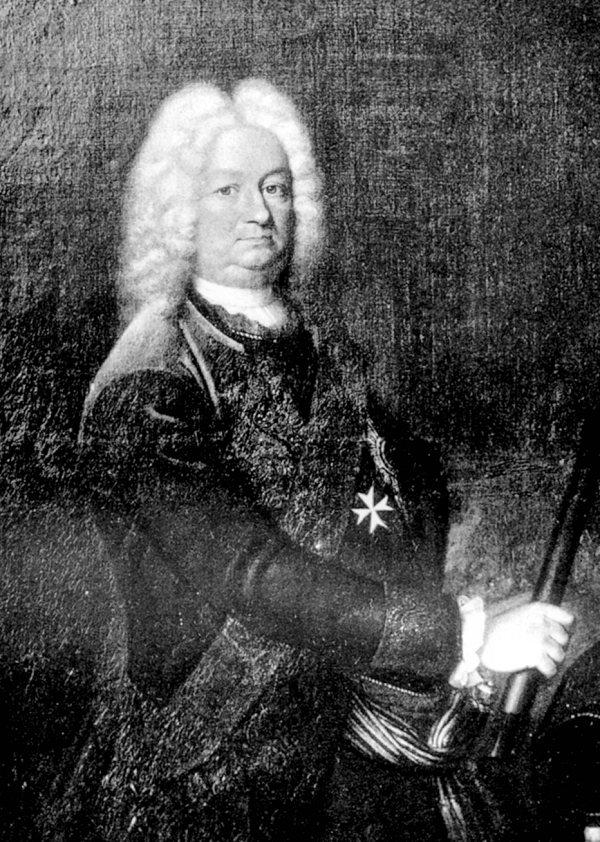
Count Albrecht Konrad Finck von Finckenstein.

Count Albrecht Konrad Reinhold Finck von Finckenstein (30 October 1660 in Saberau – 16 December 1735 in Berlin) was a Prussian nobleman, field marshal and statesman.

Finck von Finckenstein came from ancient Prussian nobility or according to the Imperial Count Diploma originally from Carinthia and was the son of a Prussian chamberlain.

He was born in Saberau in the Duchy of Prussia and became a Prussian field marshal and tutor to two Prussian crown princes, Governor of Pillau, general of a regiment, knight of the Order of the Black Eagle, Knight of the Order of St John, Captain to Krossen, as well as Master of the Finckenstein estate.

He went into Dutch, then French war service, but resigned from French service when Louis XIV mobilised against Germany and destroyed Heidelberg and the Heidelberg Castle in 1689. He acquired a position as a Prussian Major in 1689 through "prudence and moderation, as well as exceptional conduct". He was Lord Chamberlain for two crown princes, became in 1710 Imperial Count (Reichsgraf) of the Holy Roman Empire and Count (Graf) in Prussia after the Battle of Malplaquet in which he successfully led the Prussian forces under Prince Eugene. His military career culminated in 1733 when he was made Prussian field marshal.

In the years 1716 to 1720, Finck von Finckenstein had Finckenstein Palace built after the design of John von Collas.
