= Szymany, Nidzica County =

Szymany
- Village
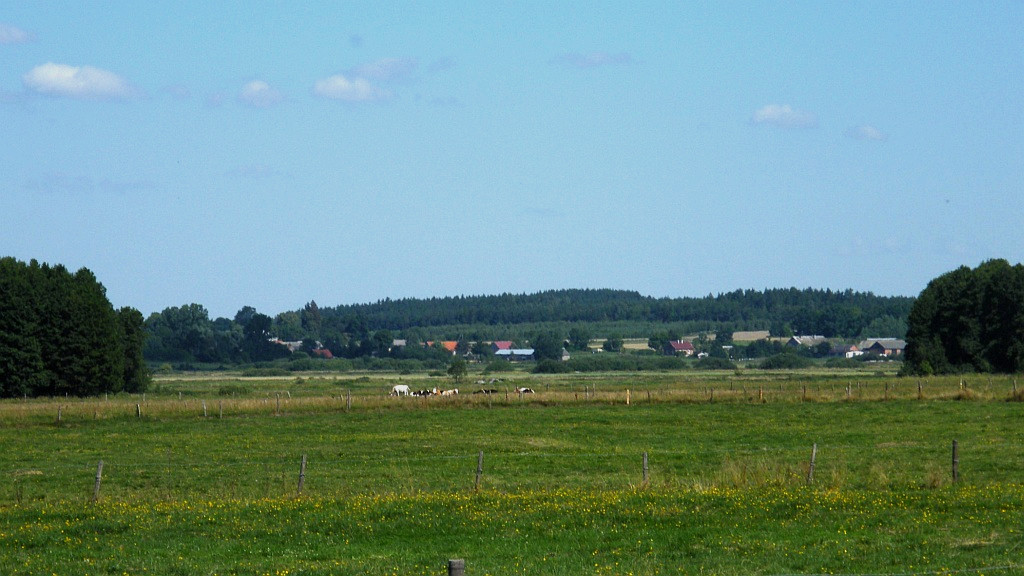
- View of Szymany from the south

- Location within Poland
- Coordinates: 53°19′N 20°24′E
- Country: Poland
- Voivodeship: Warmian-Masurian
- County: Nidzica
- Gmina: Kozłowo
- Population: 70
- Time zone: UTC+1 (CET)
  - Summer (DST): UTC+2 (CEST)

Szymany (Polish: [ʂɨˈmanɨ]) is a village in the administrative district of Gmina Kozłowo, within Nidzica County, Warmian-Masurian Voivodeship, in northern Poland. It is located in the historic region of Masuria.
