= Lelkowo =

- Village
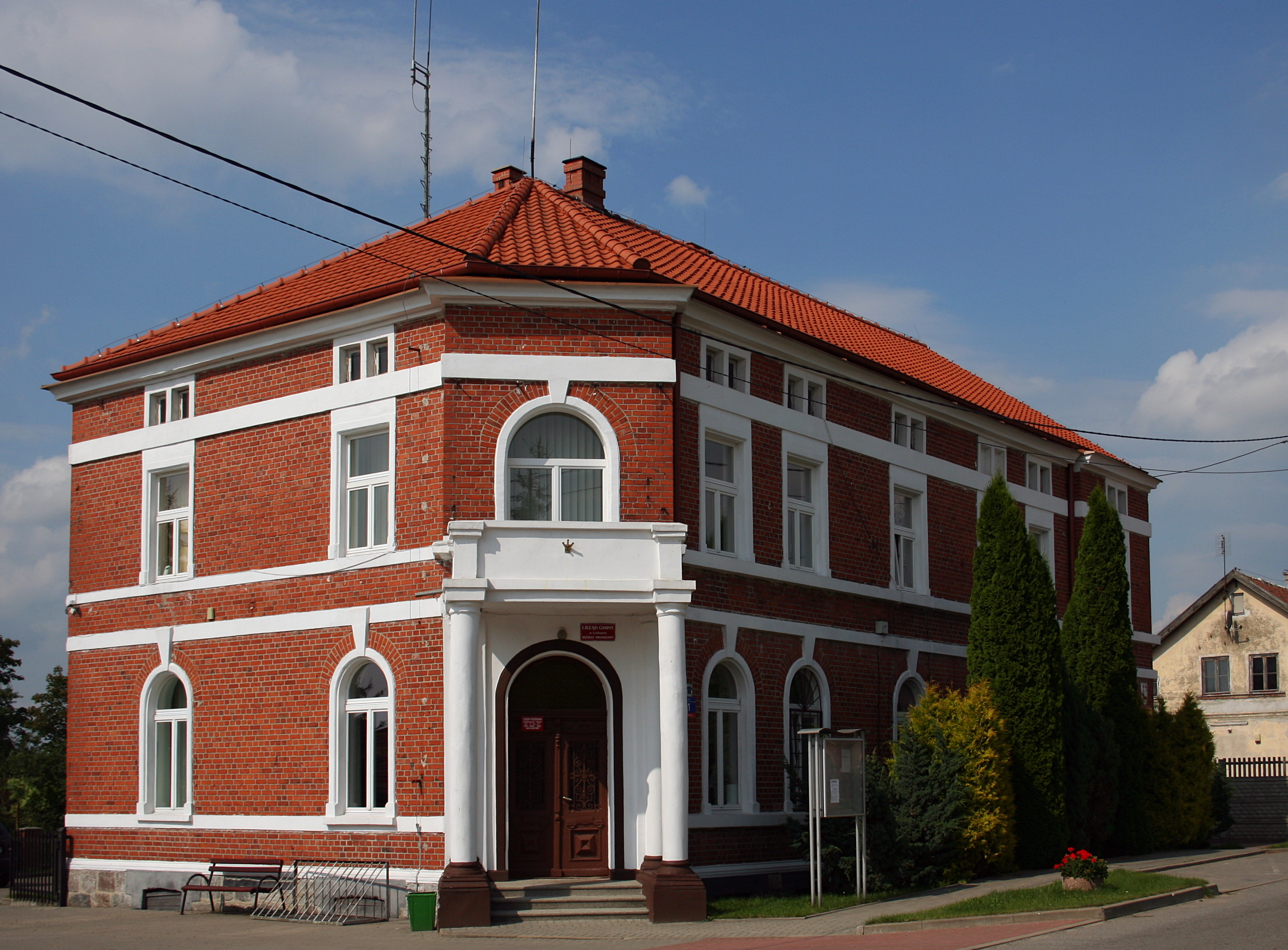
- Gmina office

- Location within Poland
- Coordinates: 54°19′28″N 20°13′29″E
- Country: Poland
- Voivodeship: Warmian-Masurian
- County: Braniewo
- Gmina: Lelkowo
- Population: 1,080
- Time zone: UTC+1 (CET)
  - Summer (DST): UTC+2 (CEST)
- Vehicle registration: NBR

Lelkowo [lɛlˈkɔvɔ] is a village in Braniewo County, Warmian-Masurian Voivodeship, in northern Poland, close to the border with the Kaliningrad Oblast of Russia. It is the seat of the gmina (administrative district) called Gmina Lelkowo.
