= Siemianowo, Warmian-Masurian Voivodeship =

Siemianowo
- Village
- Location within Poland
- Coordinates: 53°24′10″N 20°14′21″E
- Country: Poland
- Voivodeship: Warmian-Masurian
- County: Nidzica
- Gmina: Kozłowo

Siemianowo [ɕɛmjaˈnɔvɔ] is a village in the administrative district of Gmina Kozłowo, located within Nidzica County, Warmian-Masurian Voivodeship, in northern Poland.
