= Górowo, Nidzica County =

Górowo
- Village
- Location within Poland
- Coordinates: 53°17′N 20°25′E
- Country: Poland
- Voivodeship: Warmian-Masurian
- County: Nidzica
- Gmina: Kozłowo
- Population: 80

Górowo [ɡuˈrɔvɔ] is a village in the administrative district of Gmina Kozłowo, within Nidzica County, Warmian-Masurian Voivodeship, in northern Poland.
