= Wierzbowo, Nidzica County =

Wierzbowo
- Village
- Location within Poland
- Coordinates: 53°20′59″N 20°13′26″E
- Country: Poland
- Voivodeship: Warmian-Masurian
- County: Nidzica
- Gmina: Kozłowo
- Population: 200

Wierzbowo [vjɛʐˈbɔvɔ] is a village in the administrative district of Gmina Kozłowo, within Nidzica County, Warmian-Masurian Voivodeship, in northern Poland.
