= Zaborowo, Gmina Kozłowo =

Zaborowo
- Village
- Location within Poland
- Coordinates: 53°17′N 20°22′E
- Country: Poland
- Voivodeship: Warmian-Masurian
- County: Nidzica
- Gmina: Kozłowo
- Population: 150

Zaborowo ([zabɔˈrɔvɔ]; German: Saberau) is a village in the administrative district of Gmina Kozłowo, within Nidzica County, Warmian-Masurian Voivodeship, in northern Poland.

== Notable residents ==
- Albrecht Konrad Finck von Finckenstein (1660–1735), tutor of Frederick II of Prussia
