= Gmina Kozłowo =

Gmina Kozłowo Kozłowo Commune
- Gmina
- Interactive map of Gmina Kozłowo
- Coordinates (Kozłowo): 53°18′24″N 20°17′16″E
- Country: Poland
- Voivodeship: Warmian-Masurian
- County: Nidzica
- Seat: Kozłowo

Area
  - Total: 254.01 km^{2} (98.07 sq mi)

Population (2006)
  - Total: 6,141
  - Density: 24.18/km^{2} (62.62/sq mi)
- Website: http://www.kozlowo.pl

Gmina Kozłowo is a rural gmina (administrative district) in Nidzica County, Warmian-Masurian Voivodeship, in northern Poland. Its seat is the village of Kozłowo, which lies approximately 11 kilometres (7 mi) south-west of Nidzica and 55 km (34 mi) south of the regional capital Olsztyn.

The gmina covers an area of 254.01 square kilometres (98.1 sq mi), and as of 2006 its total population is 6,141.

== Villages ==
Gmina Kozłowo contains the villages and settlements of Bartki, Browina, Cebulki, Dziurdziewo, Górowo, Kozłowo, Krokowo, Michałki, Niedanowo, Pielgrzymowo, Rogóż, Sarnowo, Siemianowo, Sławka Mała, Sławka Wielka, Szkotowo, Szkudaj, Szymany, Turówko, Turowo, Ważyny, Wierzbowo, Wola, Zabłocie Kozłowskie, Zaborowo, Zakrzewko, Zakrzewo and Zalesie.

== Neighbouring gminas ==
Gmina Kozłowo is bordered by the gminas of Dąbrówno, Działdowo, Grunwald, Iłowo-Osada, Janowiec Kościelny, Nidzica and Olsztynek.
