= Kreenheinstetten =

- Ortsteil of Leibertingen
- Coat of arms
- Interactive map of Kreenheinstetten
- Location within Germany Location within Baden-Württemberg
- Coordinates: 48°03′27″N 09°03′05.06″E
- Country: Germany
- State: Baden-Württemberg
- District: Sigmaringen
- Municipality: Leibertingen
- Elevation: 793 m (2,602 ft)

Population (2006-12-31)
  - Total: 689
- Time zone: UTC+01:00 (CET)
  - Summer (DST): UTC+02:00 (CEST)
- Postal codes: 88637
- Dialling codes: 07570

Kreenheinstetten (municipality Leibertingen) is a village located in the district of Sigmaringen (Baden-Württemberg) in Germany.

== Notable Persons ==
- Abraham a Sancta Clara (1644-1709) born at Kreenheinstetten

=== Historical monument ===
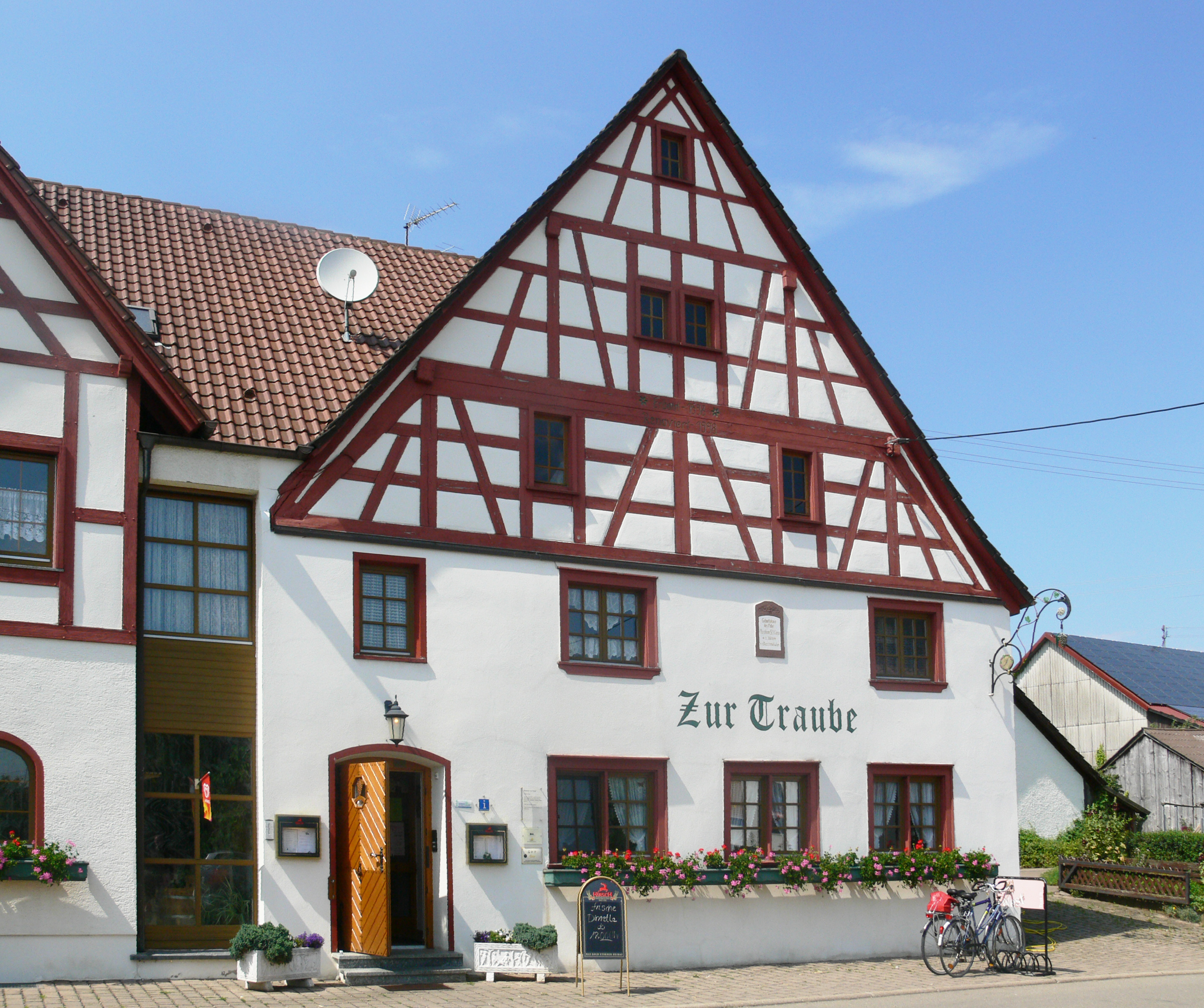
The inn „Zur Traube“, birthplace of Abraham a Sancta Clara at Kreenheinstetten.

- The birthplace of Abraham a Sancta Clara is still the same inn „Zur Traube“ as at the time of his birth in 1644.
