= Michałki, Nidzica County =

Michałki
- Village
- Location within Poland
- Coordinates: 53°26′N 20°18′E
- Country: Poland
- Voivodeship: Warmian-Masurian
- County: Nidzica
- Gmina: Kozłowo

Population
  - Total: 140
- Time zone: UTC+1 (CET)
  - Summer (DST): UTC+2 (CEST)

Michałki (Polish: [miˈxawkʲi]) is a village in the administrative district of Gmina Kozłowo, within Nidzica County, Warmian-Masurian Voivodeship, in northern Poland.

== Geography ==
Michałki lies in a region characterized by post glacial terrain, including forests, lakes, and rolling hills. The area is part of the Nidzica Plain (Równina Nidzicka), which is bordered by the Omulew Lake to the east and the Nida River to the west.

== History ==
The village was mentioned in a register from 1436–1437. As of 1600, the population of the village was solely Polish. From the 18th century, it formed part of the Kingdom of Prussia, and from 1871 of the German Empire, within which it was administratively located in the province of East Prussia. Following Germany's defeat in World War II in 1945, it was transferred to Poland under the Potsdam Agreement. The village was repopulated by Poles displaced from Soviet-annexed former eastern territories of Poland (modern-day Lithuania/Belarus).

== Administration ==
Michałki is part of Gmina Nidzica, a mixed urban-rural municipality. The village is governed by the Nidzica County (Powiat Nidzicki), which includes 4 communes and 33 villages.

== Demographics ==
Exact population figures are unavailable, but Michałki is estimated to have fewer than 100 residents, typical of small Masurian settlements.
