= Turowo, Nidzica County =

Turowo
- Village
- Location within Poland
- Coordinates: 53°26′15″N 20°12′38″E
- Country: Poland
- Voivodeship: Warmian-Masurian
- County: Nidzica
- Gmina: Kozłowo
- Population: 160

Turowo [tuˈrɔvɔ] is a village in the administrative district of Gmina Kozłowo, within Nidzica County, Warmian-Masurian Voivodeship, in northern Poland.
