= Sówki, Warmian-Masurian Voivodeship =

Sówki
- Village
- Location within Poland
- Coordinates: 54°22′N 20°15′E
- Country: Poland
- Voivodeship: Warmian-Masurian
- County: Braniewo
- Gmina: Lelkowo

Sówki [ˈsufki] is a village in the administrative district of Gmina Lelkowo, within Braniewo County, Warmian-Masurian Voivodeship, in northern Poland, close to the border with the Kaliningrad Oblast of Russia.
