= Wildenstein Castle (Leibertingen) =

Castle in Baden-Wuerttemberg, Germany

- Leibertingen, Germany
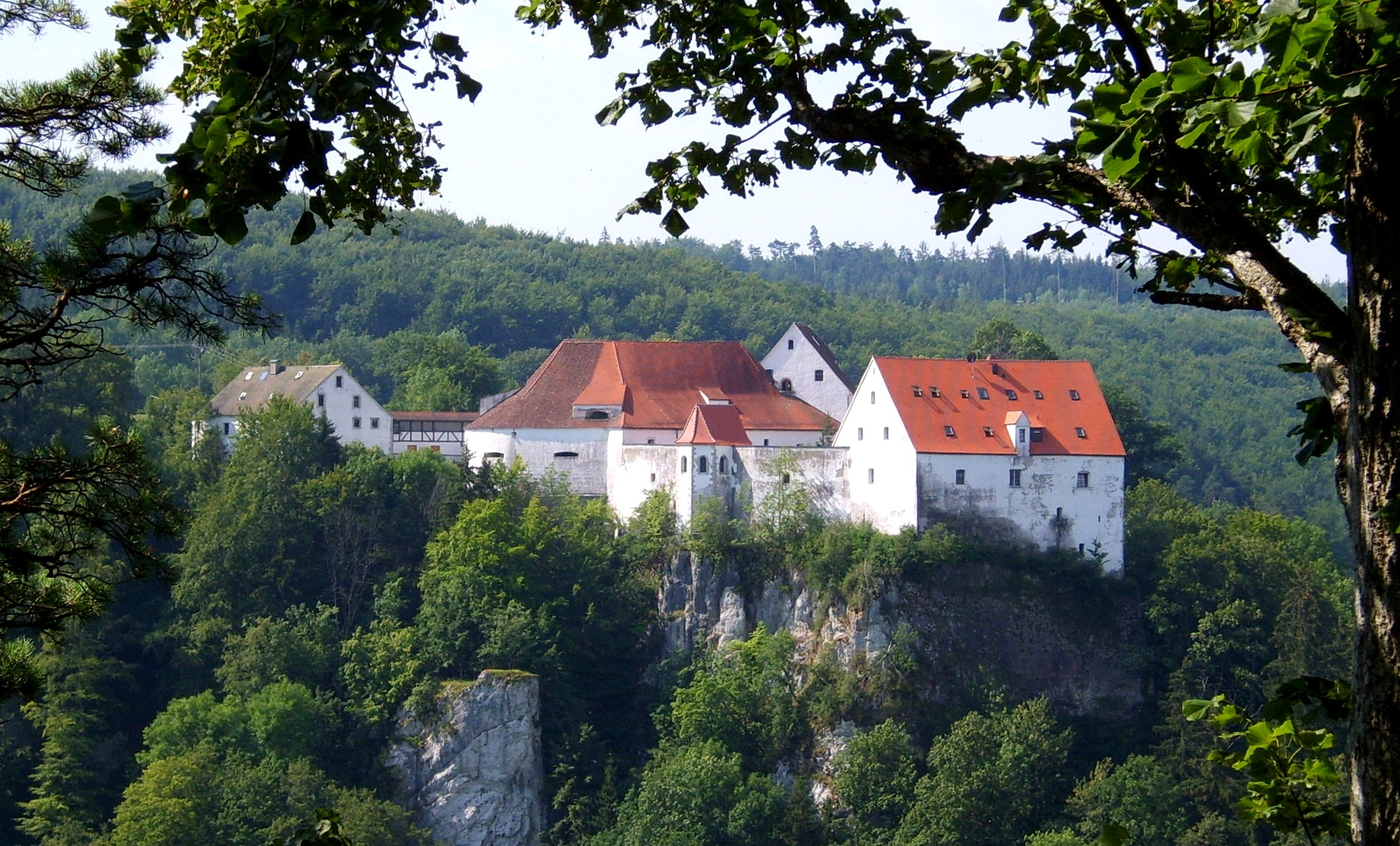
- View of the fortified castle from the "Bandfelsen"

Site information
- Owner: Das Deutsche Jugendherbergswerk

Location
- Coordinates: 48°03′19.48″N 9°00′2.9″E

Site history
- Built: c. 1200 – 1300
- Built by: Herren von Wildenstein, Anselm von Justingen, Werner von Zimmern d. J.

Burg Wildenstein (Leibertingen), a fortified spur castle, built between 1200 and 1300 A.D., is situated above the Danube break-through at the Swabian Alb in Baden-Württemberg, Germany. It functions now as a hostel of the German Youth Hostel Association ("Deutsches Jugendherbergswerk").

== See also ==
- List of forts
- List of castles in Baden-Württemberg
