= Wilknicki Młyn =

- Settlement
- Location within Poland
- Coordinates: 54°16′32″N 20°10′35″E
- Country: Poland
- Voivodeship: Warmian-Masurian
- County: Braniewo
- Gmina: Lelkowo

Wilknicki Młyn (Polish pronunciation: [vilkˈnit͡ski ˈmwɨn]) is a settlement in the administrative district of Gmina Lelkowo, within Braniewo County, Warmian-Masurian Voivodeship, in northern Poland, close to the border with the Kaliningrad Oblast of Russia.
