= Majkowski =

Majkowski (feminine: Majkowska) is a Polish surname. Notable people with the surname include:

- Aleksander Majkowski (1876–1938), Kashubian writer, poet, journalist, editor, activist, and physician
- Don Majkowski (born 1964), American football player
- Justyna Majkowska (born 1977), Polish singer
- Kamil Majkowski (born 1989), Polish footballer
- Maria Ilnicka, maiden name Majkowska (1825 or 1827–1897), Polish poet, novelist, translator and journalist

== See also ==
- Majewski
- Małkowski (surname)
- Blake Mycoskie (born 1976), American entrepreneur, author, founder of Toms Shoes
