= Talheim (disambiguation) =

Talheim may refer to places in Baden-Württemberg, Germany:

- Talheim, Heilbronn, in the district of Heilbronn
- Talheim, Tuttlingen, in the district of Tuttlingen
- a borough of Horb am Neckar in Freudenstadt (district)
- a borough of Mössingen in Tübingen (district)
- a borough of Tengen in Konstanz (district)
- a borough of Vellberg in Schwäbisch Hall (district)
- a borough of Lauterach in Alb-Donau-District

== See also ==
- Thalheim (disambiguation)
