= Cebulki =

Village in Warmian-Masurian, Poland

- Village
- Location within Poland
- Coordinates: 53°19′5″N 20°19′58″E
- Country: Poland
- Voivodeship: Warmian-Masurian
- County: Nidzica
- Gmina: Kozłowo
- Population: 240

Cebulki [t͡sɛˈbulki] (meaning 'onions' or 'bulbs') is a village in the administrative district of Gmina Kozłowo, within Nidzica County, Warmian-Masurian Voivodeship, in northern Poland.
