= Niedanowo =

- Village
- Location within Poland
- Coordinates: 53°16′40″N 20°19′47″E
- Country: Poland
- Voivodeship: Warmian-Masurian
- County: Nidzica
- Gmina: Kozłowo
- Highest elevation: 200 m (660 ft)
- Lowest elevation: 100 m (330 ft)
- Population: 210

Niedanowo [ɲɛdaˈnɔvɔ] is a village in the administrative district of Gmina Kozłowo, within Nidzica County, Warmian-Masurian Voivodeship, in northern Poland.
