= Wola Wilknicka =

- Village
- Location within Poland
- Coordinates: 54°17′15″N 20°9′4″E
- Country: Poland
- Voivodeship: Warmian-Masurian
- County: Braniewo
- Gmina: Lelkowo
- Population: 120

Wola Wilknicka [ˈvɔla vilkˈnit͡ska] is a village in the administrative district of Gmina Lelkowo, within Braniewo County, Warmian-Masurian Voivodeship, in northern Poland, close to the border with the Kaliningrad Oblast of Russia.
