= Słup, Braniewo County =

Słup
- Village
- Location within Poland
- Coordinates: 54°17′47″N 20°12′2″E
- Country: Poland
- Voivodeship: Warmian-Masurian
- County: Braniewo
- Gmina: Lelkowo
- Population: 30

Słup [swup] is a village in the administrative district of Gmina Lelkowo, within Braniewo County, Warmian-Masurian Voivodeship, in northern Poland, close to the border with the Kaliningrad Oblast of Russia.
