= Leibertingen =

- Municipality
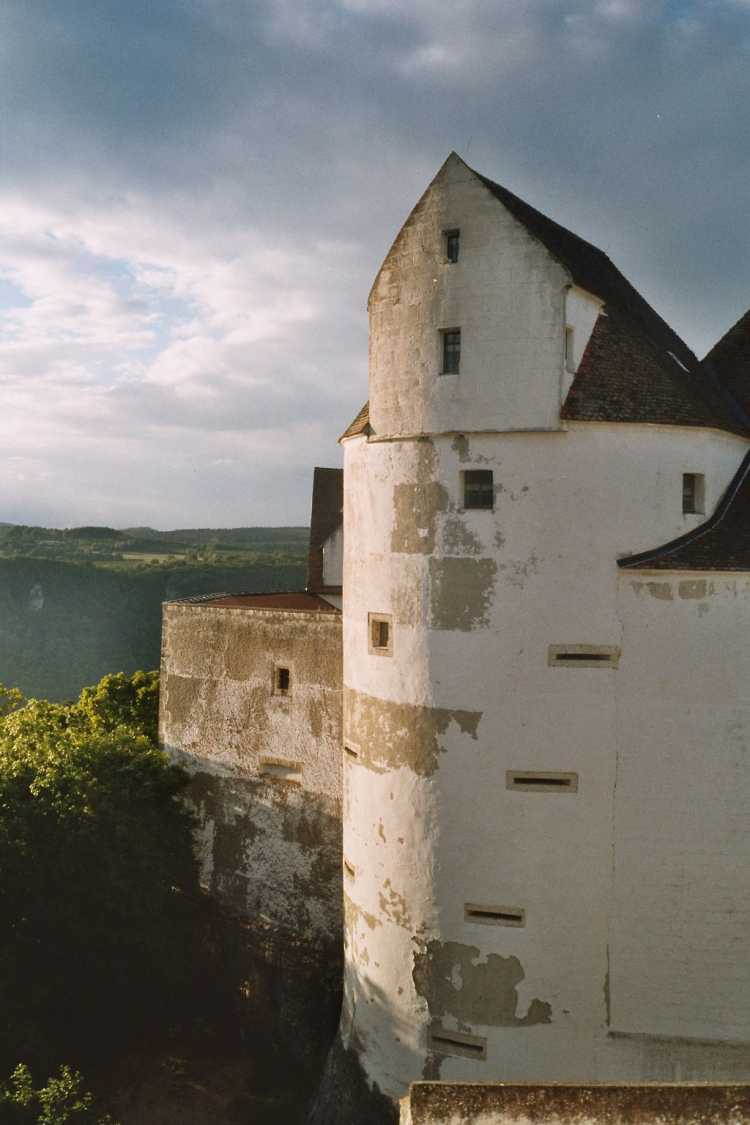
- Wildenstein Castle

- Coat of arms

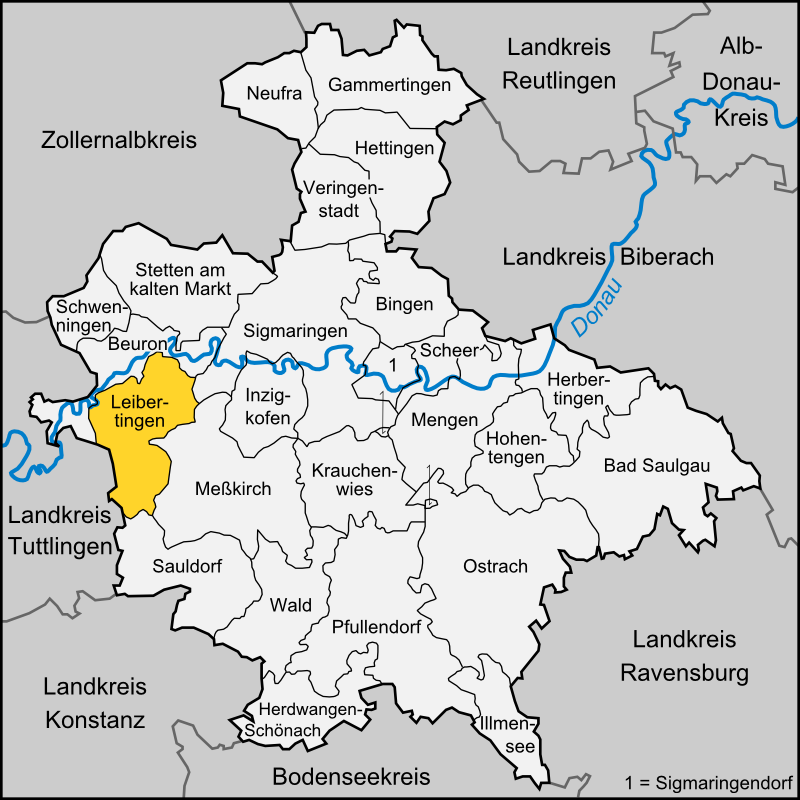
- Location of Leibertingen within Sigmaringen district
- Interactive map of Leibertingen
- Location within Germany Location within Baden-Württemberg
- Coordinates: 48°2′34″N 9°0′49″E
- Country: Germany
- State: Baden-Württemberg
- Admin. region: Tübingen
- District: Sigmaringen

Government
  - Mayor (2021–29): Stephan Frickinger

Area
  - Total: 47.20 km^{2} (18.22 sq mi)
- Elevation: 806 m (2,644 ft)

Population (2025-12-31)
  - Total: 2,260
  - Density: 47.9/km^{2} (124/sq mi)
- Time zone: UTC+01:00 (CET)
  - Summer (DST): UTC+02:00 (CEST)
- Postal codes: 88637
- Dialling codes: 07466
- Vehicle registration: SIG
- Website: www.leibertingen.de

Leibertingen is a municipality in the district of Sigmaringen in Baden-Württemberg, Germany.

== Geography ==
=== Geographical location ===
Leibertingen is located 600 to 850 meters above sea level directly over the Danube valley in the Heuberg region, a plateau at the southern bound corner of the Swabian Jura, with a distance of 22 km to Sigmaringen and 24 km to Tuttlingen and belongs to the Naturpark Obere Donau. Of the total area of around 4720 hectares (as of Dec. 31 2010), 2127 hectare are forest, 2328 hectare are farmland and 257 hectares consist of residential and circulation areas. The so-called "Dreiländereck" (Eng. border triangle) is located underneath the nearby Wildenstein mountain. This is where Württemberg (Irndorf parish), Hohenzollern-Sigmaringen (Beuron parish) and Baden (Leibertingen parish) come together.

== Municipality ==
Leibertingen forms the name-giving municipality with the adjoining villages of Altheim, Kreenheinstetten and Thalheim.

Coat of arms	Villages	Inhabitants (2008)	Area
Leibertingen	Leibertingen (main locality)	681	1729 ha
Kein Wappen Verfügbar	Altheim	250	456 ha
Kreenheinstetten	Kreenheinstetten	651	1588 ha
Thalheim	Thalheim	666	947 ha

=== Administration ===
Leibertingen forms with the neighboring towns of Sauldorf and Meßkirch an association of its municipal administration.

== History ==
In historic documents Leibertingen was mentioned in the year 1275 for the first time; Altheim however already in the year 768, and Kreenheinstetten in 793.

== Demographics ==
Population development:

Year	Inhabitants
1990	2,036
2001	2,230
2011	2,187
2021	2,144

== Architecture, people and yearly events ==
=== Historical buildings ===
- Burg Wildenstein

=== Notable people ===
- Abraham a Sancta Clara (1644–1709) born at Kreenheinstetten

=== Yearly events ===
- The "Wildensteiner Jahrmarkt"

== Sport ==
- Leibertingen harbors a gliding airfield, where during the year various events take place.
