= Browina, Warmian-Masurian Voivodeship =

Village in Northern Poland

Browina
- Village
- Location within Poland
- Coordinates: 53°27′N 20°12′E
- Country: Poland
- Voivodeship: Warmian-Masurian
- County: Nidzica
- Gmina: Kozłowo
- Population: 180

Browina [brɔˈvina] is a village in the administrative district of Gmina Kozłowo, within Nidzica County, Warmian-Masurian Voivodeship, in northern Poland.
