= Krzekoty =

- Village
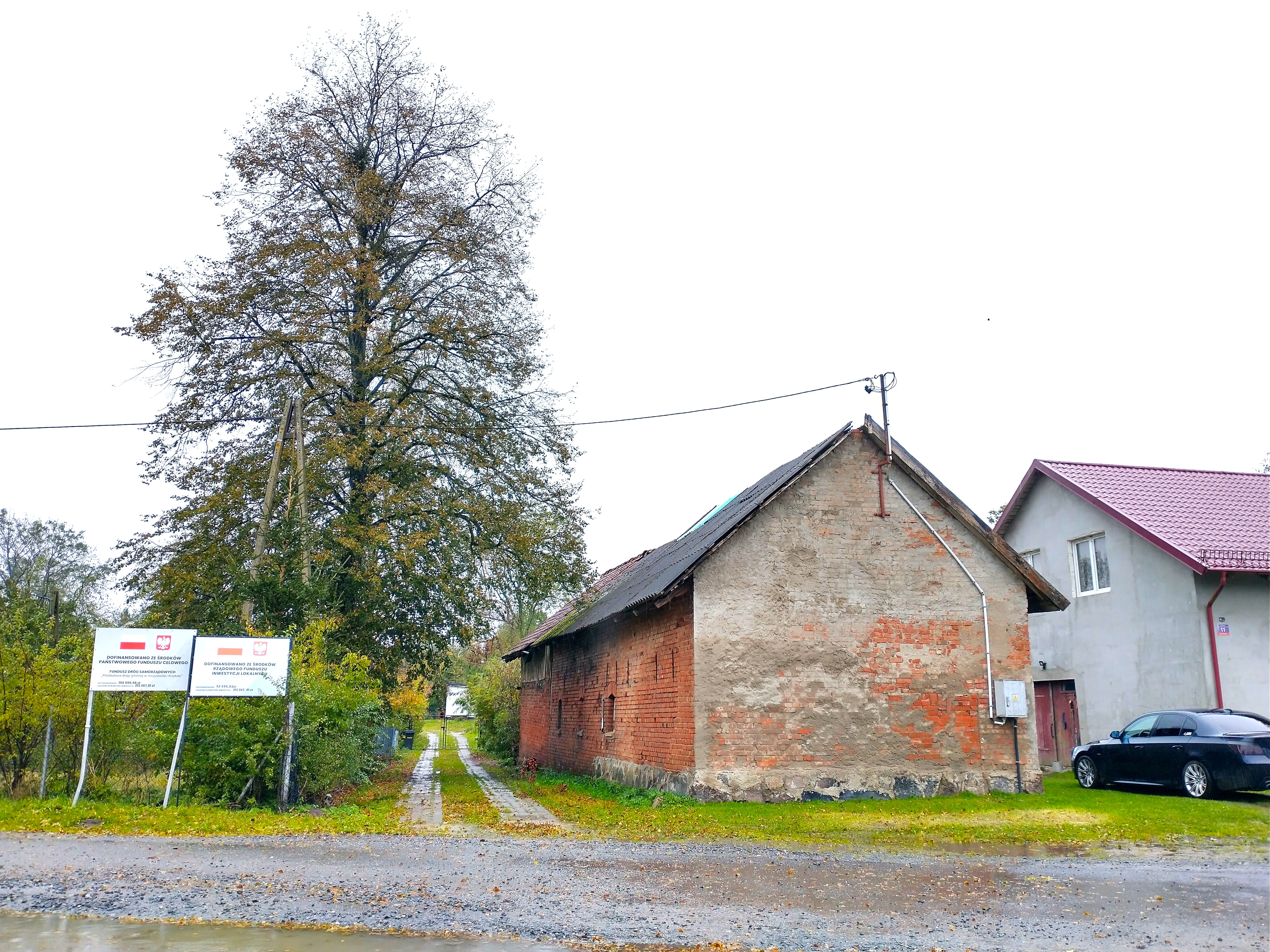

- Location within Poland
- Coordinates: 54°21′N 20°10′E
- Country: Poland
- Voivodeship: Warmian-Masurian
- County: Braniewo
- Gmina: Lelkowo

Population
  - Total: 70
- Time zone: UTC+1 (CET)
  - Summer (DST): UTC+2 (CEST)
- Vehicle registration: NBR

Krzekoty [kʂɛˈkɔtɨ] is a village in the administrative district of Gmina Lelkowo, within Braniewo County, Warmian-Masurian Voivodeship, in northern Poland, close to the border with the Kaliningrad Oblast of Russia.

Two Polish citizens were murdered by Nazi Germany in the village during World War II.
