= Wołowo =

- Village
- Location within Poland
- Coordinates: 54°19′N 20°10′E
- Country: Poland
- Voivodeship: Warmian-Masurian
- County: Braniewo
- Gmina: Lelkowo

Wołowo [vɔˈwɔvɔ] is a village in the administrative district of Gmina Lelkowo, within Braniewo County, Warmian-Masurian Voivodeship, in northern Poland, close to the border with the Kaliningrad Oblast of Russia.
