= Grabowiec, Braniewo County =

Grabowiec Schönwalde
- Village
- Location within Poland
- Coordinates: 54°22′N 20°13′E
- Country: Poland
- Voivodeship: Warmian-Masurian
- County: Braniewo
- Gmina: Lelkowo

Grabowiec [ɡraˈbɔvjɛt͡s] is a village in the administrative district of Gmina Lelkowo, within Braniewo County, Warmian-Masurian Voivodeship, in northern Poland, close to the border with the Kaliningrad Oblast of Russia.
