= Młyniec, Warmian-Masurian Voivodeship =

Młyniec
- Settlement
- Location within Poland
- Coordinates: 54°19′40″N 20°12′24″E
- Country: Poland
- Voivodeship: Warmian-Masurian
- County: Braniewo
- Gmina: Lelkowo

Młyniec [ˈmwɨɲɛt͡s] is a settlement in the administrative district of Gmina Lelkowo, within Braniewo County, Warmian-Masurian Voivodeship, in northern Poland, close to the border with the Kaliningrad Oblast of Russia.

== Climate ==
Annual average temperatures range between 6 and 8 °C, with a thermal amplitude of 19–22 °C between the highest and lowest temperatures throughout the year. Winter typically lasts from December to February and is characterized by cold weather and snowfall, while summer is short and moderately warm, with the highest temperatures occurring in July and August.

Annual precipitation ranges from 550 to 700 mm, with snowfall in winter accounting for approximately 15–20% of the total annual precipitation. Snow cover can persist for 70–100 days in some areas.
