= Zofia Majewska =

Polish neurologist

Zofia Majewska (1907-1997) was a Polish neurologist and professor at the University of Warsaw.

== Early life and education ==
Majewska was born on January 13, 1907 in Warsaw. At birth her name was Aniela Gelbard, a name she retained until 1946. Her father, Henryk, was a surgeon, and her mother, Helena nee Lichtenfeld, a dentist. She was a student of the Secondary School of Teacher's Trade Union in Warsaw, and in 1924 she began her studies at the Faculty of Medicine of the University of Warsaw. Six years later she earned her Ph.D. in medicine.

== Career ==
She then studied neurology in Leningrad and in 1947 received her specialist degree in neurology. In 1932 she was employed by the department of neurology at the University of Warsaw that was headed by Professor Kazimierz Orzechowski, where she worked until she had to leave in 1939 to follow the rules of the German authorities. She worked in the Department of Neurology until the outbreak of World War II, when she was forced to leave due to her Jewish ancestry. Until 1943, she worked in the infectious disease ward in a hospital in Czyste, at the same time participating in secret teaching of medical students.

In 1946 she moved to Gdańsk where she worked at a neurology clinic. In 1950 she established a department of child neurology, the first department of its kind in Poland. In 1951, she replaced Professor Jakimowicz as the head of the Department and Clinic of Neurology at the Medical University of Gdańsk, and in 1954 she became an associate professor and in 1960 a full professor. Also, she first woman in the history of the Medical Academy in Gdańsk. In 1970, she became the head of the Developmental Neurology Clinic, which she ran until her retirement in 1977.

She died in Gdańsk on November 19th, 1997.

== Honors and awards ==
Majewska was awarded an honorary degree from the University of Medical Sciences in Gdansk.
