= Dziurdziewo =

- Village
- Location within Poland
- Coordinates: 53°23′N 20°13′E
- Country: Poland
- Voivodeship: Warmian-Masurian
- County: Nidzica
- Gmina: Kozłowo
- Population: 280

Dziurdziewo [d͡ʑurˈd͡ʑɛvɔ] (formerly German: Thalheim) is a village in the administrative district of Gmina Kozłowo, within Nidzica County, Warmian-Masurian Voivodeship, in northern Poland.
