= Bartki, Braniewo County =

Bartki
- Village
- Location within Poland
- Coordinates: 54°18′N 20°11′E
- Country: Poland
- Voivodeship: Warmian-Masurian
- County: Braniewo
- Gmina: Lelkowo

Bartki [ˈbartki] is a village in the administrative district of Gmina Lelkowo, within Braniewo County, Warmian-Masurian Voivodeship, in northern Poland, close to the border with the Kaliningrad Oblast of Russia.
