= Krokowo, Nidzica County =

Krokowo
- Village
- Location within Poland
- Coordinates: 53°15′N 20°23′E
- Country: Poland
- Voivodeship: Warmian-Masurian
- County: Nidzica
- Gmina: Kozłowo

Population
  - Total: 140
- Time zone: UTC+1 (CET)
  - Summer (DST): UTC+2 (CEST)
- Vehicle registration: NNI

Krokowo [krɔˈkɔvɔ] is a village in the administrative district of Gmina Kozłowo, within Nidzica County, Warmian-Masurian Voivodeship, in northern Poland. It is located in Masuria.

== History ==
The village was first mentioned either in 1371 or 1391. As of 1542, the population of the village was exclusively Polish.

During World War II, in March 1944, Polish partisans from the Home Army killed two German soldiers in the village.
