= Abraham a Sancta Clara =

Augustinian friar (1644–1709)

The Reverend Abraham a Sancta Clara
- Augustinian Friar
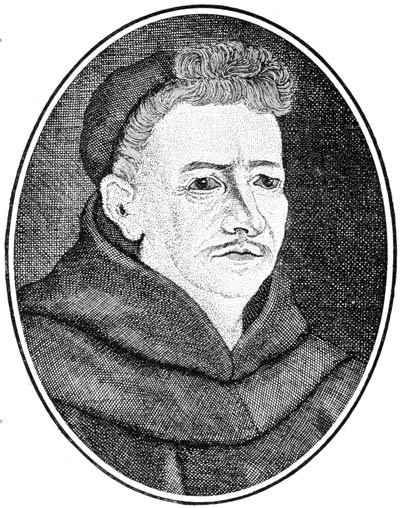

Personal details
- Born: Johann Ulrich Megerle; 2 July 1644 Kreenheinstetten, Germany
- Died: 1 December 1709 (aged 65) Vienna, Austria
- Denomination: Catholic

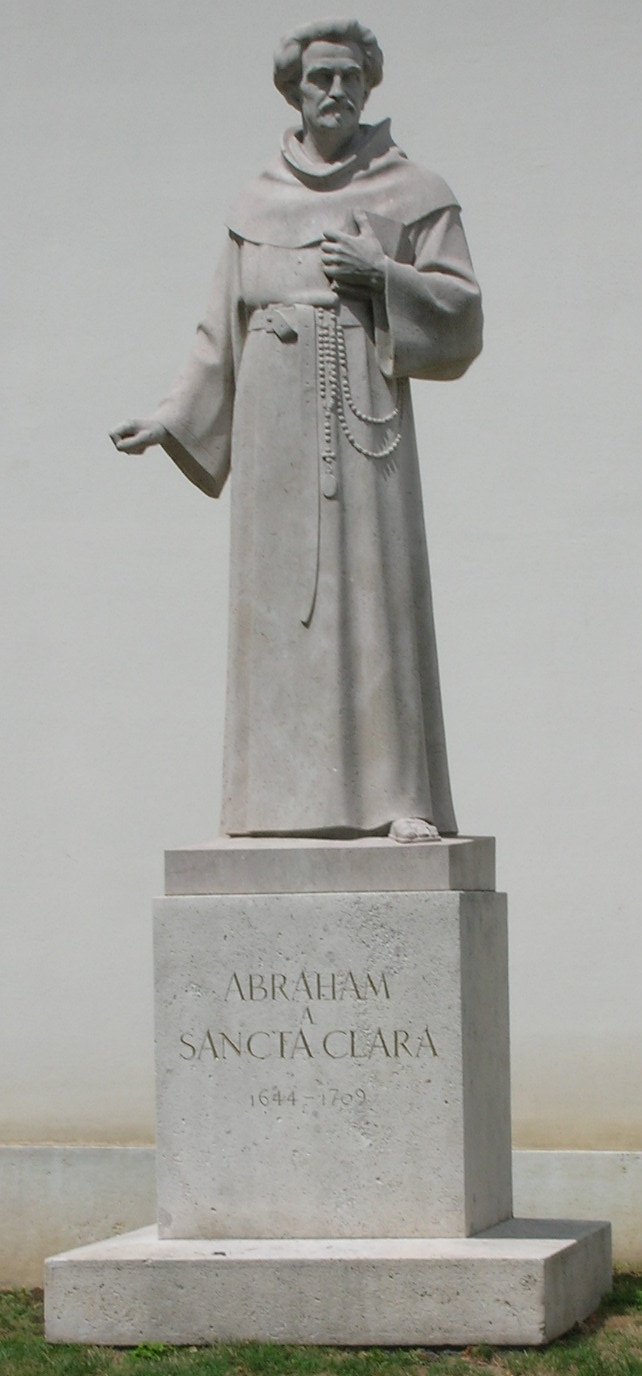
Statue of Abraham a Sancta Clara, outside the Imperial Palace, Vienna

Abraham a Sancta Clara (born Johann Ulrich Megerle; 2 July 1644 – 1 December 1709) was an Augustinian friar.

== Early life ==
Sancta Clara was born Johann Ulrich Megerle, in Kreenheinstetten, Germany on 2 July 1644. He was described as "a very eccentric but popular Augustinian monk".

His antisemitism has been noted to have had an influence on political antisemitism including supporters of Nazism, including Heidegger.

== Career ==
In 1662, Abraham a Sancta Clara joined the Catholic religious order of Discalced Augustinians, and assumed the name by which he is known. In this order, he rose to become definitor and prior provincial of his province. He gained a great reputation for pulpit eloquence early on. He was appointed imperial court preacher of Vienna in 1669.

The people flocked to hear him, attracted by the force and simplicity of his language, the grotesqueness of his humour, and the impartial severity with which he lashed the follies of all social classes. The predominant quality of his style was an overflowing and often coarse wit. Many passages in his sermons offer loftier thoughts and more dignified language.

In his published writings, he displayed many of the same qualities as in the pulpit, shown best through the most notable specimen of his style, his didactic novel entitled Judas der Erzschelm (4 vols., Salzburg, 1686–1695). His work has been several times reproduced in whole or in part, though infected with spurious interpolations.

He died in Vienna on 1 December 1709 at the age of 65.

== Works ==
- Der alte Hafen scheppert - 1672 - eLibrary Projekt ( - eLib - text in German)
- Österreichisches Deo Gratias - 1688 - eLibrary Projekt ( - eLib - text in German)
- Wunderlicher Traum von einem großen Narren-Nest (Wonderful Dream of a Great Nest of Fools) - 1703 (pub. 1710) - eLibrary Projekt ( - eLib - text in German)
