= Ewa Majewska =

Polish philosopher

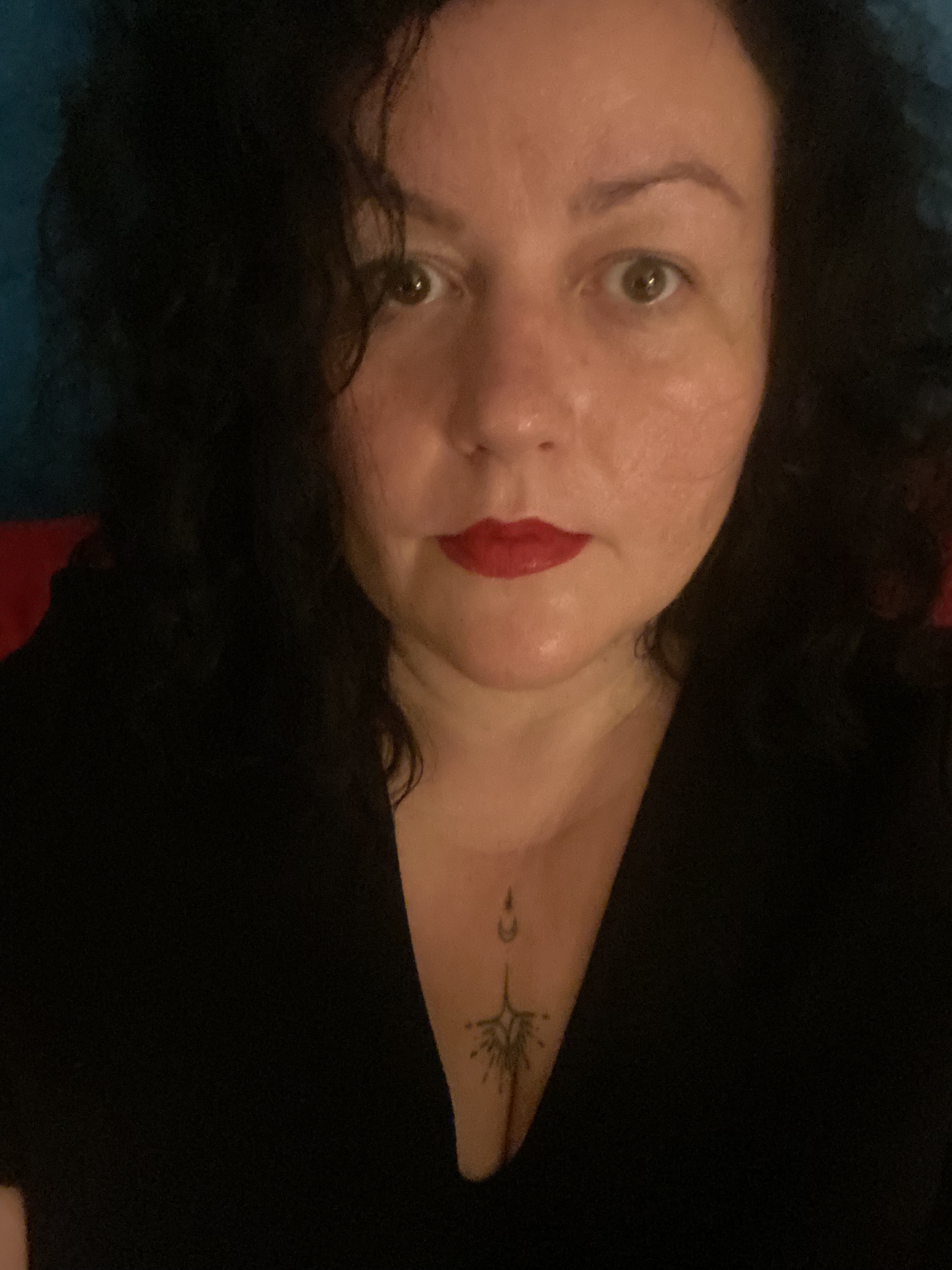
- 1978
- Born: Ewa Alicja Majewska; 1978 (age 47–48); Warsaw, Warsaw Voivodeship, Polish People's Republic

Academic background
- Education: University of Warsaw
- Thesis: (2007)

Academic work
- Discipline: Philosophy
- Sub-discipline: Feminist philosophy
- Institutions: SWPS University
- Main interests: Archive studies; anti-fascism; dialectics; feminist critical theory; gender studies; the subaltern
- Website: ewa-majewska.com

Ewa Alicja Majewska (born 1978) is a Polish philosopher, political activist and an author. In the 1990s and early 2000s, she was involved in anarchist, anti-border, ecological and women's movements.

She is a contributor to prominent international conferences, projects and published articles and essays, in journals, magazines, and collected volumes, including: e-flux, Signs, Third Text, Journal of Utopian Studies, and Jacobin.

She was visiting fellow at UC Berkeley, Institute for Human Sciences (IWM) and at the Institute of Cultural Inquiry (ICI). She is an associate professor at the SWPS University in Warsaw, Poland.

== Biography ==
Majewska studied philosophy, French literature and gender studies at the University of Warsaw, Poland. She completed her doctorate on philosophical concepts of the family at the University of Warsaw in 2007. In 2021 she completed her habilitation in cultural studies, with a book and several articles on subaltern counterpublics. Since 2022 she is a professor at the SWPS University in Warsaw, Poland. Since 2003, she has been a lecturer in gender studies at the university.

From 2011 to 2013, she was a professor at the Institute of Culture at the Jagiellonian University in Cracow, Poland, followed by two years as a visiting fellow at the IWM in Vienna, Austria and a further two years (2014-2016) at the ICI in Berlin.

Her current research is in Hegel's philosophy, focusing on dialectics and the weak, feminist critical theory, and antifascist cultures. Her book, Feminist Antifascism: Counterpublics of the Common, was published by Verso in 2021.

She volunteered for the Polish IndyMedia and worked in the women's section of the Committee for Assistance and Defense of Repressed Workers. She is also the author of a report on violence against women in the family and intimate relations for the Polish branch of Amnesty International (2005).

In 2004, together with Aleksandra Polisiewicz, she formed the duo Syreny TV. It produced documentaries from a series of Warsaw demonstrations and the project All Forward to the Extreme Right (2005). This film is a record of conversations revolving around the analogy between Poland of 2005 and the Weimar Republic. It was screened in Weimar at the festival Attention, Polen Kommen! (2005) and at exhibitions in Warsaw and Gdańsk.

=== Politics ===
In the years 2015-2018, she was a member of the social-democratic Polish political party, Lewica Razem (Left Together), and occupied positions on the party's supervising committee and national council. In the parliamentary elections in 2015, she ran for the Sejm in the Warsaw district from 26th place on the Total List. As part of the party, she participated in the work of the statutory commission, and co-created the 'Together for Culture' programme, as well as the "Razem for Sport" declaration. In May 2016, she was elected to the party's national audit committee and in June 2017 to the national council. Since the end of 2018, she is no longer a party member.

== Books ==
=== As single author ===
- Feminist Antifascism. Counterpublics of the Common. London and New York: Verso, 2021.ISBN 978-18-3976-118-8.
- Mariola Przyjemska, Spacerowiczka gentryfikowanej Warszawy. Warsaw: Instytut Wydawniczy Książka i Prasa, 2022.ISBN 978-83-6661-543-4.
- Kontrpubliczności ludowe i feministyczne. Wczesna ‘Solidarność’ i Czarne Protesty. Warsaw: Instytut Wydawniczy Książka i Prasa, 2018.ISBN 978-83-6530-473-5.
- Tramwaj zwany uznaniem. Feminizm i solidarność po neoliberalizmie. Warsaw: Instytut Wydawniczy Książka i Prasa, 2017. ISBN 978-83-6530-447-6.
- Art as a guise? Censorship and other paradoxes of politicizing culture. Krakow: Ha!art corporation, 2013, series: The Radical Line. ISBN 978-83-64057-30-4.
- Feminism as a social philosophy: Sketches from family theory. Warsaw: Difin, 2009. ISBN 978-83-7641-091-3.

=== Shared authorship ===
- Ewa Majewska, Jan Sowa (ed.): Zniewolony umysł 2. Krakow: korporacja ha!art, 2007, series: The Radical Line. ISBN 83-89911-61-2.
- Martin Kaltwasser, Ewa Majewska, Kuba Szreder (ed.): Futurism of industrial cities. Kraków: korporacja ha!art, 2007. ISBN 978-83-89911-70-4.
- E. Majewska, E. Rutkowska, Equal School, House of Polish-German Cooperation, Gliwice, 2007.
- A. Wolosik, E. Majewska, Sexual harassment Stupid fun or serious matter, Diffin Publishing House, Warsaw, 2011.

=== Recent publications ===
- 'But I am your mother!? Queer-feminist resistance to censorship in fascist times', in: European Journal of Women's Studies, 32(1)2025
- 'Abortion in the State of Exception: Weak Resistance and Unheroic Reproductive Solidarity in Poland', in: Critical Times, 7(1)2024:
- 'Towards a Weak Avant-Garde, Re-Shaping the Canon', in: Arts, 12(2)2023:70
- 'Belonging despite the state of exception. The LGBTQ+ counterpublics in Poland after 2015', in: Othering and Belonging Institute, Berkeley University, 22 April 2022
- 'Anti-fascist Cultures, Institutions of the Common, and Weak Resistance in Poland', in: Third Text, 33/2019: A Bitter Victory?
- Praktyka Teoretyczna on Weak Resistance (2/2019):
- On Feminism: Feminism Will Not Be Televised
- On Ophelic Counterpublics: Ewa Majewska en
