= Sławka Wielka =

- Village
- Location within Poland
- Coordinates: 53°21′N 20°16′E
- Country: Poland
- Voivodeship: Warmian-Masurian
- County: Nidzica
- Gmina: Kozłowo
- Population: 260

Sławka Wielka [ˈswafka ˈvjɛlka] is a village in the administrative district of Gmina Kozłowo, within Nidzica County, Warmian-Masurian Voivodeship, in northern Poland.
