= Edmund Majowski =

Polish footballer and coach

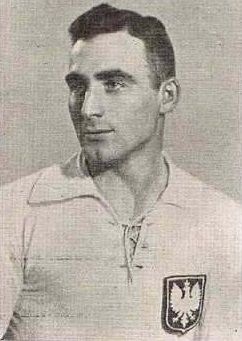

Personal information
- Date of birth: 12 November 1910
- Place of birth: Chorzów, German Empire
- Date of death: 26 October 1982 (aged 71)
- Place of death: Wien, Austria
- Height: 1.70 m (5 ft 7 in)
- Position: Striker

Senior career*
Years	Team	Apps	(Gls)
1925–1931	AKS Chorzów		
1931–1939	Pogoń Lwów		
- SSTV Breslau
- DTSG Krakau
- Germania Königshütte
1945–1947	Admira Vienna		

International career
1933–1934	Poland	4	(1)

Managerial career
- Wiener AC
- 1953–1954: FC Wien
- 1954–1955: Sarpsborg FK
- 1958: Norway
- Kuwait
- Ethnikos Piraeus
- 1969–1970: Sarpsborg FK
- * Club domestic league appearances and goals

Edmund Majowski (12 November 1910 – 26 October 1982) was a Polish footballer and manager.

== Playing career ==
Majowski, who played as a striker, spent his professional career in both Poland and Austria, playing for AKS Chorzów, Pogoń Lwów and Admira Vienna.

Majowski also represented Poland at international level, scoring one goal in four games between 1933 and 1934.

== Coaching career ==
Majowski managed the Norwegian national team between 1957 and 1958 and the Kuwait national team in 1958.
