= Rogóż, Nidzica County =

Rogóż
- Village
- Location within Poland
- Coordinates: 53°22′N 20°15′E
- Country: Poland
- Voivodeship: Warmian-Masurian
- County: Nidzica
- Gmina: Kozłowo
- Population: 370

Rogóż [ˈrɔɡuʂ] is a village in the administrative district of Gmina Kozłowo, within Nidzica County, Warmian-Masurian Voivodeship, in northern Poland.
