= Soch (disambiguation) =

Soch is a 2002 Hindi-language film.

Soch may also refer to:

- Swedish Open Cultural Heritage (SOCH), a web service used to search and fetch data from any organization that holds information or pictures related to the Swedish cultural heritage
- Soch Kraal (1782–1854), Kashmiri poet
- Soch, a song by Indian singer Hardy Sandhu
- Afon Soch, a river in Gwynedd, Wales

== See also ==
- Szűcs, a Hungarian name (including a list of persons with the name)
