= Zabi (disambiguation) =

Zabi may refer to:

Geography:

- Zabi Rog (literally "Frog's Corner/Frog's Horn"), village in Gmina Morąg, Ostróda County, Warmian-Masurian Voivodeship, Poland
- Zabi or Kūh-e Zābī, mountain in western Afghanistan

Anime:

- Degwin Sodo Zabi, fictional character in the anime Mobile Suit Gundam universe
- Dozle Zabi, fictional character in the anime Mobile Suit Gundam universe
- Garma Zabi, fictional character in the anime Mobile Suit Gundam universe
- Gihren Zabi, fictional character in the anime Mobile Suit Gundam universe
- Kycilia Zabi, fictional character in the anime Mobile Suit Gundam universe
- Mineva Lao Zabi, fictional character in the anime Mobile Suit Gundam universe

== See also ==
- Jabi
- Ksabi
- Sabi (disambiguation)
- Zabie (disambiguation)
- Ząbie
