= Szucs =

Szucs may refer to:

- Szűcs, a Hungarian surname
- Szúcs, a municipality and village in Hungary
