= Waplewo =

Waplewo may refer to the following places in Poland:

- Waplewo, Olsztyn County
- Waplewo, Szczytno County
- Waplewo Wielkie, Sztum County
