= Manki =

Manki may refer to:

- Manki, Honnavar, a village in Karnataka, India
- Manki Sharif, Nowshera District Pakistan
- Manki, Swabi, Swabi District Pakistan
- Manki, Papua New Guinea
- Mańki, Poland

== Peoples ==
Manki is a head of the Pir (Panchayat) in the Manki-Munda governance system. Manki is also a surname in Ho, Munda and Bhumij community of Jharkhand, India.

== See also ==
- Mankey (Pokémon character)
