= Spoguny =

- Location within Poland
- Coordinates: 53°40′N 20°20′E
- Country: Poland
- Voivodeship: Warmian-Masurian
- County: Olsztyn
- Gmina: Olsztynek

Spoguny [spɔˈɡanɨ] is part of the village of Zezuty in the administrative district of Gmina Olsztynek, within Olsztyn County, Warmian-Masurian Voivodeship, in northern Poland.
