= Świerkocin =

Świerkocin may refer to the following places:

- Świerkocin, Kuyavian-Pomeranian Voivodeship (north-central Poland)
- Świerkocin, Lubusz Voivodeship (west Poland)
- Świerkocin, Warmian-Masurian Voivodeship (north Poland)
