= Marózka =

River in Poland

Location
- Country: Poland
- Voivodeship: Warmian–Masurian

Physical characteristics
- Source: Jezioro Gardyńskie
  - location: northeast of Gardyny, Ostróda County
  - coordinates: 52°25′40″N 20°11′25″E
- Mouth: Łyna
  - location: Kurki, Olsztyn County
  - coordinates: 53.5367°N 20.4749°E
  - elevation: 125.6 m (412 ft)
- Length: 45.22 km (28.10 mi)

Basin features
- Progression: Łyna→ Pregolya→ Baltic Sea

Marózka is a river of Poland. It flows into the river Łyna close to its outflow from the lake Kiernoz Wielki near Kurki.
