= Gibala (disambiguation) =

Gibala may refer to:

Places

- Gibała, a village in Warmian-Masurian Voivodeship, Poland
- Tell Tweini, an archaeological site in Syria

People

- Miloš Gibala (born 1985), Slovak footballer
- Roman Gibala (born 1972), Czech footballer
- Ronald Gibala, American engineer

Other

- Gibala regimen
