= Jedwabno, Warmian-Masurian Voivodeship =

Jedwabno
- Village
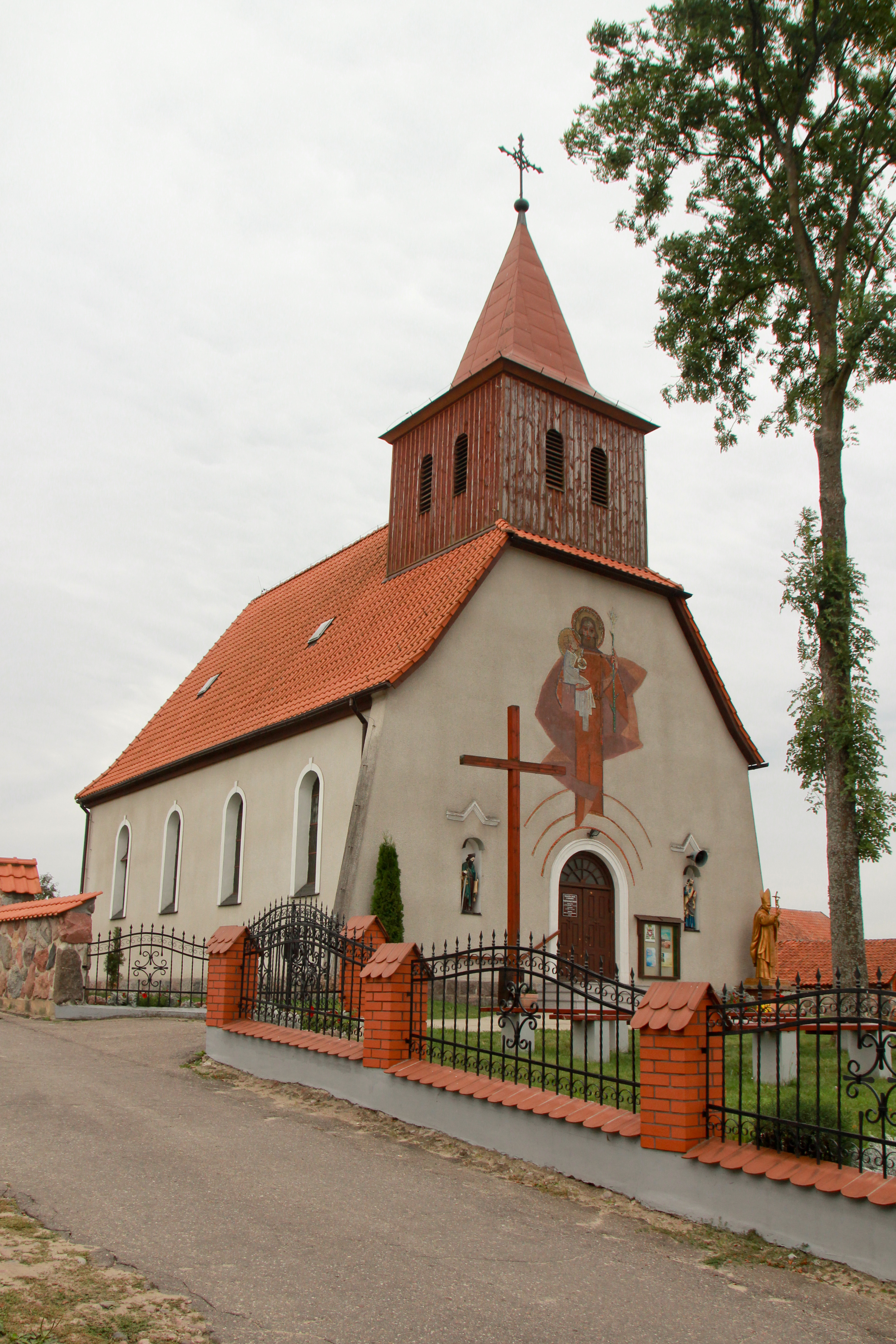
- Saint Joseph church in Jedwabno

- Location within Poland
- Coordinates: 53°31′47″N 20°43′47″E
- Country: Poland
- Voivodeship: Warmian-Masurian
- County: Szczytno
- Gmina: Jedwabno

Population
  - Total: 1,125
- Time zone: UTC+1 (CET)
  - Summer (DST): UTC+2 (CEST)
- Vehicle registration: NSZ
- Primary airport: Olsztyn-Mazury Airport

Jedwabno [jɛdˈvabnɔ] is a village in Szczytno County, Warmian-Masurian Voivodeship, in northern Poland. It is the seat of the administrative district of Gmina Jedwabno. It is located in the region of Masuria.

== History ==
In 1436, in records of the commander of Ostróda, a first time mention of the settlement of Gedwangen in the Prussian territory of Sassen is noted. The name Gedwangen includes the Prussian language words "gedian" thicket and "wangus" (cleared oak forest). A church was built at that time and the inhabitants are recorded to have lived mainly from forest beekeeping. Later Protestant settlers from other parts of Poland to Masuria introduced the name Jedwabno.

In the late 19th century, the village had a population of 700, solely Polish Protestants. It hosted two annual fairs in the late 19th century.

During World War II, the Germans operated two forced labour subcamps of the Stalag I-B prisoner-of-war camp in the village.

== Notable people ==
- Maria Gurowska (1915–1998), Polish judge
