= Sudwa =

- Village
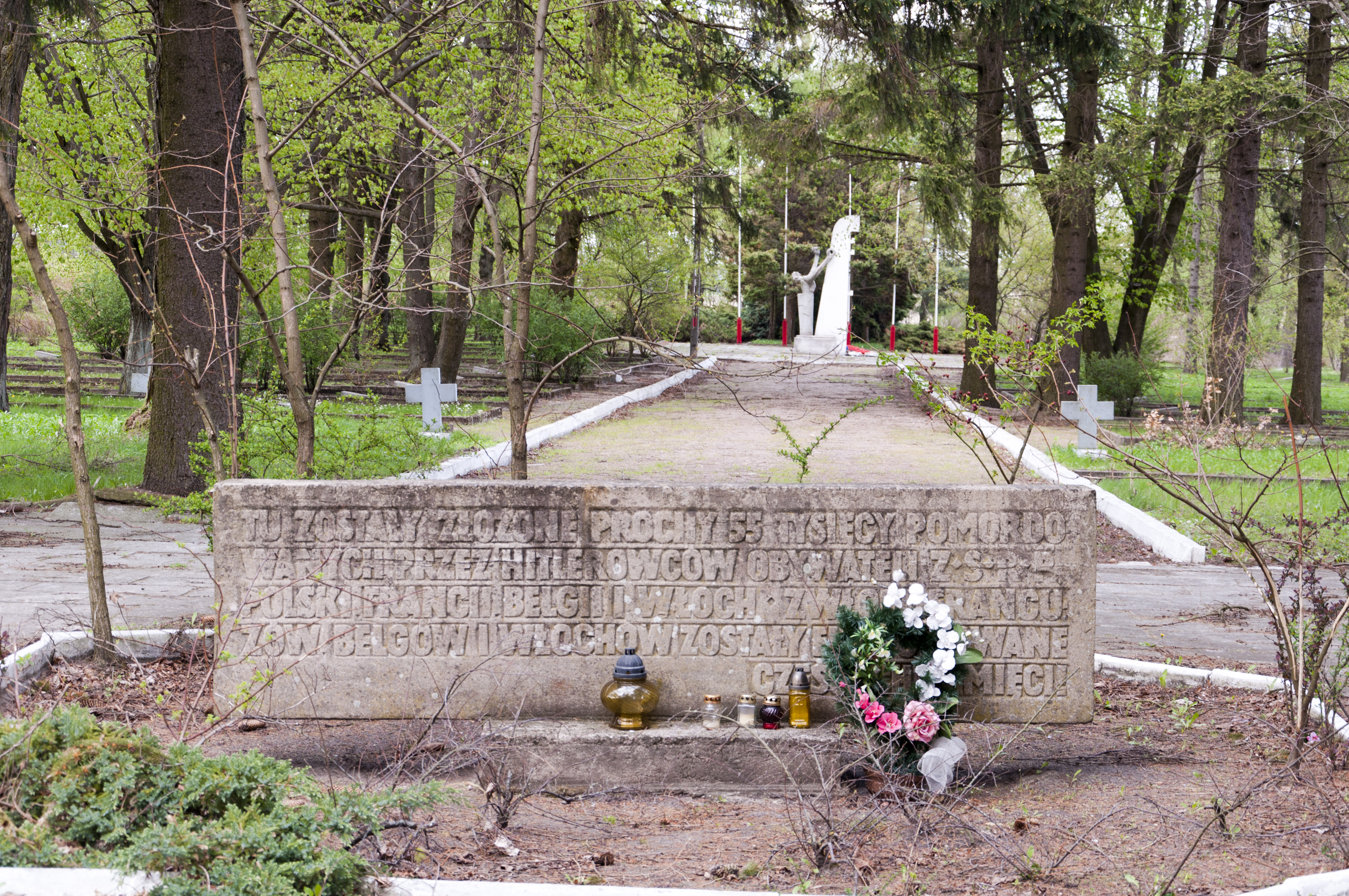
- World War II cemetery of the victims of Stalag IB in Sudwa.

- Location within Poland
- Coordinates: 53°36′N 20°16′E
- Country: Poland
- Voivodeship: Warmian-Masurian
- County: Olsztyn
- Gmina: Olsztynek
- Population: 240

Sudwa [ˈsudva] is a village in the administrative district of Gmina Olsztynek, within Olsztyn County, Warmian-Masurian Voivodeship, in northern Poland.
