= Gmina Jedwabno =

Gmina Jedwabno Jedwabno Commune
- Gmina
- Flag Coat of arms
- Interactive map of Gmina Jedwabno
- Coordinates (Jedwabno): 53°31′47″N 20°43′47″E
- Country: Poland
- Voivodeship: Warmian-Masurian
- County: Szczytno
- Seat: Jedwabno

Area
  - Total: 311.51 km^{2} (120.27 sq mi)

Population (2006)
  - Total: 3,561
  - Density: 11.43/km^{2} (29.61/sq mi)
- Website: http://www.jedwabno.com

Gmina Jedwabno is a rural gmina (administrative district) in Szczytno County, Warmian-Masurian Voivodeship, in northern Poland. Its seat is the village of Jedwabno, which lies approximately 18 kilometres (11 mi) west of Szczytno and 32 km (20 mi) south-east of the regional capital Olsztyn.

The gmina covers an area of 311.51 square kilometres (120.3 sq mi), and as of 2006 its total population is 3,561.

== Villages ==
Gmina Jedwabno contains the villages and settlements of Brajniki, Burdąg, Czarny Piec, Dębowiec, Dłużek, Dzierzki, Kot, Lipniki, Małszewo, Narty, Nowe Borowe, Nowy Dwór, Nowy Las, Piduń, Rekownica, Szuć, Waplewo, Warchały, Witówko and Witowo.

== Neighbouring gminas ==
Gmina Jedwabno is bordered by the gminas of Janowo, Nidzica, Olsztynek, Pasym, Purda, Szczytno and Wielbark.
