= Stare Gaje =

Stare Gaje, Poland
- Village
- Location within Poland
- Coordinates: 53°37′03″N 20°10′43″E
- Country: Poland
- Voivodeship: Warmian-Masurian
- County: Olsztyn
- Gmina: Olsztynek

Stare Gaje [ˈstarɛ ˈɡajɛ] is a village in the administrative district of Gmina Olsztynek, within Olsztyn County, Warmian-Masurian Voivodeship, in northern Poland.
