= Kot, Warmian-Masurian Voivodeship =

Kot
- Village
- Location within Poland
- Coordinates: 53°29′N 20°40′E
- Country: Poland
- Voivodeship: Warmian-Masurian
- County: Szczytno
- Gmina: Jedwabno

Kot [kɔt] (German: Omulefofen) is a village in the administrative district of Gmina Jedwabno, within Szczytno County, Warmian-Masurian Voivodeship, in northern Poland.
