= Świętajńska Karczma =

- Village
- Location within Poland
- Coordinates: 53°35′21″N 20°12′59″E
- Country: Poland
- Voivodeship: Warmian-Masurian
- County: Olsztyn
- Gmina: Olsztynek

Świętajńska Karczma (Polish: [ɕfjɛnˈtajj̃ska ˈkart͡ʂma]) is a village in the administrative district of Gmina Olsztynek, within Olsztyn County, Warmian-Masurian Voivodeship, in northern Poland.
