= Czerwona Woda, Olsztyn County =

Czerwona Woda
- Village
- Location within Poland
- Coordinates: 53°36′25″N 20°12′24″E
- Country: Poland
- Voivodeship: Warmian-Masurian
- County: Olsztyn
- Gmina: Olsztynek
- Time zone: UTC+1 (CET)
  - Summer (DST): UTC+2 (CEST)
- Vehicle registration: NOL

Czerwona Woda [t͡ʂɛrˈvɔna ˈvɔda] is a village in the administrative district of Gmina Olsztynek, within Olsztyn County, Warmian-Masurian Voivodeship, in northern Poland. It is located in the region of Warmia.
