= Gaj, Gmina Olsztynek =

Gaj
- Village
- Location within Poland
- Coordinates: 53°38′00″N 20°10′53″E
- Country: Poland
- Voivodeship: Warmian-Masurian
- County: Olsztyn
- Gmina: Olsztynek

Gaj [ɡai̯] is a village in the administrative district of Gmina Olsztynek, within Olsztyn County, Warmian-Masurian Voivodeship, in northern Poland.
