= Czarci Jar =

- Village
- Location within Poland
- Coordinates: 53°33′18″N 20°10′03″E
- Country: Poland
- Voivodeship: Warmian-Masurian
- County: Olsztyn
- Gmina: Olsztynek

Czarci Jar [ˈt͡ʂart͡ɕi ˈjar] (German: Giballen) is a village in the administrative district of Gmina Olsztynek, within Olsztyn County, Warmian-Masurian Voivodeship, in northern Poland.
