= Tolkmity =

- Village
- Location within Poland
- Coordinates: 53°39′01″N 20°13′01″E
- Country: Poland
- Voivodeship: Warmian-Masurian
- County: Olsztyn
- Gmina: Olsztynek

Tolkmity [tɔlkˈmitɨ] is a village in the administrative district of Gmina Olsztynek, within Olsztyn County, Warmian-Masurian Voivodeship, in northern Poland.
