= Lipowo Kurkowskie =

- Village
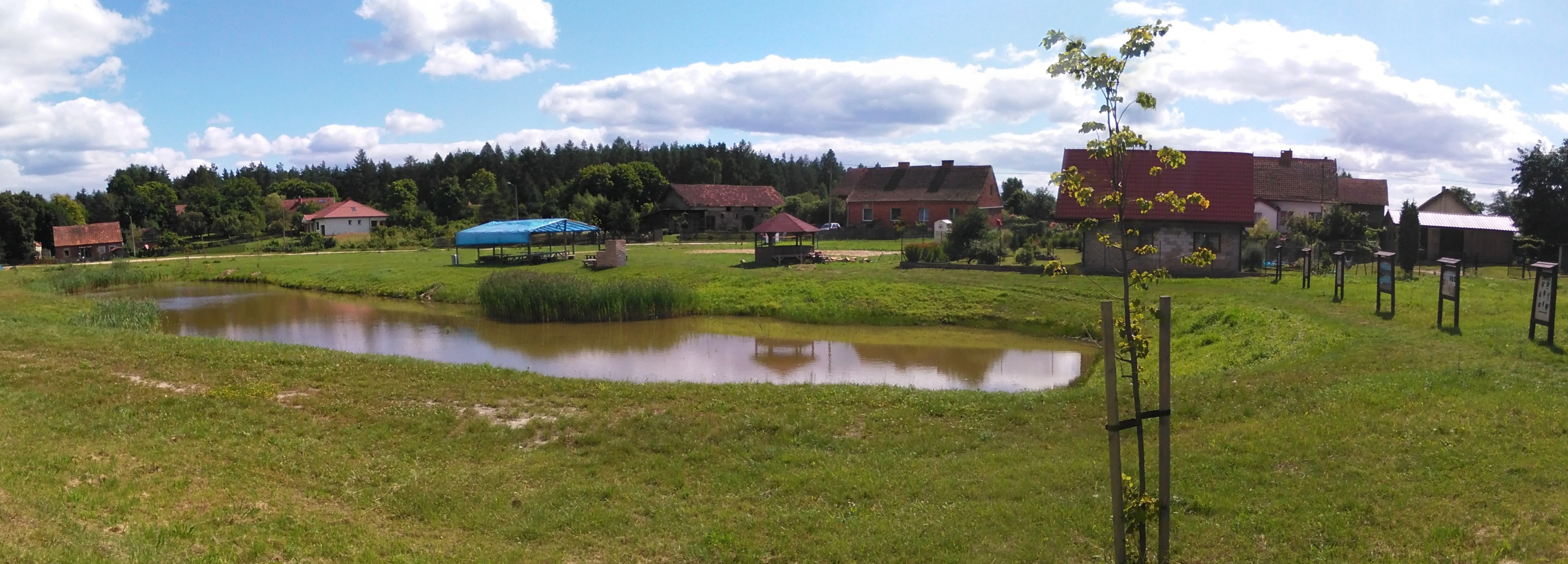
- View of the village of Lipowo Kurkowskie

- Location within Poland
- Coordinates: 53°30′31″N 20°27′11″E
- Country: Poland
- Voivodeship: Warmian-Masurian
- County: Olsztyn
- Gmina: Olsztynek

Lipowo Kurkowskie [liˈpɔvɔ kurˈkɔfskʲɛ] is a village in the administrative district of Gmina Olsztynek, within Olsztyn County, Warmian-Masurian Voivodeship, in northern Poland.
