= Lipniki, Szczytno County =

Lipniki
- Village
- Location within Poland
- Coordinates: 53°32′47.69″N 20°42′22.1″E
- Country: Poland
- Voivodeship: Warmian-Masurian
- County: Szczytno
- Gmina: Jedwabno

Lipniki (Polish: [lipˈɲikʲi]; German: Lipnicken) is a village in the administrative district of Gmina Jedwabno, within Szczytno County, Warmian-Masurian Voivodeship, in northern Poland.
