= Nowy Las, Warmian-Masurian Voivodeship =

Nowy Las
- Village
- Location within Poland
- Coordinates: 53°29′39″N 20°39′33″E
- Country: Poland
- Voivodeship: Warmian-Masurian
- County: Szczytno
- Gmina: Jedwabno

Nowy Las [ˈnɔvɨ ˈlas] is a village in the administrative district of Gmina Jedwabno, within Szczytno County, Warmian-Masurian Voivodeship, northern Poland.
