= Łęciny =

- Village
- Location within Poland
- Coordinates: 53°38′N 20°15′E
- Country: Poland
- Voivodeship: Warmian-Masurian
- County: Olsztyn
- Gmina: Olsztynek
- Founded: 1553
- Time zone: UTC+1 (CET)
  - Summer (DST): UTC+2 (CEST)
- Vehicle registration: NOL

Łęciny [wɛnˈt͡ɕinɨ] is a village in the administrative district of Gmina Olsztynek, within Olsztyn County, Warmian-Masurian Voivodeship, in northern Poland.

== History ==
The village was founded in 1553. The Cybulski Polish noble family lived in the village.
