= Nowy Dwór, Szczytno County =

Nowy Dwór
- Village
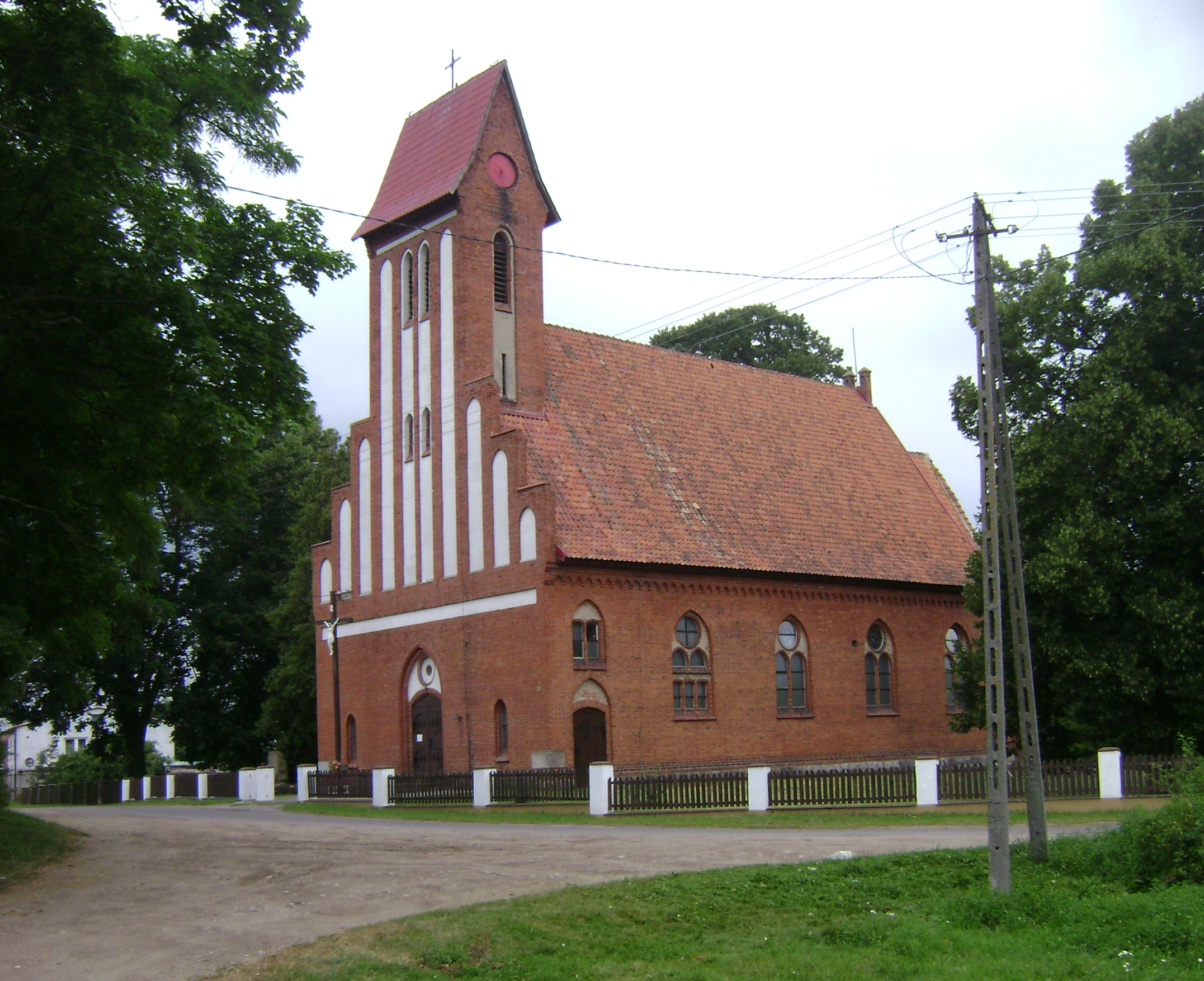

- Location within Poland
- Coordinates: 53°33′36″N 20°50′6″E
- Country: Poland
- Voivodeship: Warmian-Masurian
- County: Szczytno
- Gmina: Jedwabno
- Population: 258

Nowy Dwór [ˈnɔvɨ ˈdvur] (German: Neuhof) is a village in the administrative district of Gmina Jedwabno, within Szczytno County, Warmian-Masurian Voivodeship, in northern Poland.

The village has a population of 258.
