= Nowe Borowe =

- Village
- Location within Poland
- Coordinates: 53°30′N 20°40′E
- Country: Poland
- Voivodeship: Warmian-Masurian
- County: Szczytno
- Gmina: Jedwabno

Nowe Borowe [ˈnɔvɛ bɔˈrɔvɛ] (German: Neu Borowen) is a village in the administrative district of Gmina Jedwabno, within Szczytno County, Warmian-Masurian Voivodeship, in northern Poland.
