= Platyny =

- Village
- Location within Poland
- Coordinates: 53°36′28″N 20°10′40″E
- Country: Poland
- Voivodeship: Warmian-Masurian
- County: Olsztyn
- Gmina: Olsztynek
- Elevation: 300 m (980 ft)

Platyny [plaˈtɨnɨ] is a village in the administrative district of Gmina Olsztynek, within Olsztyn County, Warmian-Masurian Voivodeship, in northern Poland.
