= Kunki, Warmian-Masurian Voivodeship =

Kunki
- Village
- Location within Poland
- Coordinates: 53°32′N 20°18′E
- Country: Poland
- Voivodeship: Warmian-Masurian
- County: Olsztyn
- Gmina: Olsztynek

Kunki [ˈkunki] is a village in the administrative district of Gmina Olsztynek, within Olsztyn County, Warmian-Masurian Voivodeship, in northern Poland.
