= Piduń =

- Village
- Location within Poland
- Coordinates: 53°29′56″N 20°47′23″E
- Country: Poland
- Voivodeship: Warmian-Masurian
- County: Szczytno
- Gmina: Jedwabno

Piduń [ˈpiduɲ] (German: Schuttschenofen) is a village in the administrative district of Gmina Jedwabno, within Szczytno County, Warmian-Masurian Voivodeship, in northern Poland.
