= Królikowo, Warmian-Masurian Voivodeship =

Królikowo
- Village
- Location within Poland
- Coordinates: 53°34′21″N 20°15′12″E
- Country: Poland
- Voivodeship: Warmian-Masurian
- County: Olsztyn
- Gmina: Olsztynek
- Population: 260

Królikowo [kruliˈkɔvɔ] is a village in the administrative district of Gmina Olsztynek, within Olsztyn County, Warmian-Masurian Voivodeship, in northern Poland.
