= Zabie =

Zabie may refer to the following places:

- Ząbie, Warmian-Masurian Voivodeship (north Poland)
- Żabie, West Pomeranian Voivodeship (north-west Poland)
- Żabie, Polish name for Verkhovyna, Ivano-Frankivsk oblast, Ukraine
