= Witowo, Warmian-Masurian Voivodeship =

Witowo
- Village
- Location within Poland
- Coordinates: 53°34′23″N 20°48′12″E
- Country: Poland
- Voivodeship: Warmian-Masurian
- County: Szczytno
- Gmina: Jedwabno

Witowo [viˈtɔvɔ] (German: Gittau) is a village in the administrative district of Gmina Jedwabno, within Szczytno County, Warmian-Masurian Voivodeship, in northern Poland.
