= Czarny Piec =

- Village
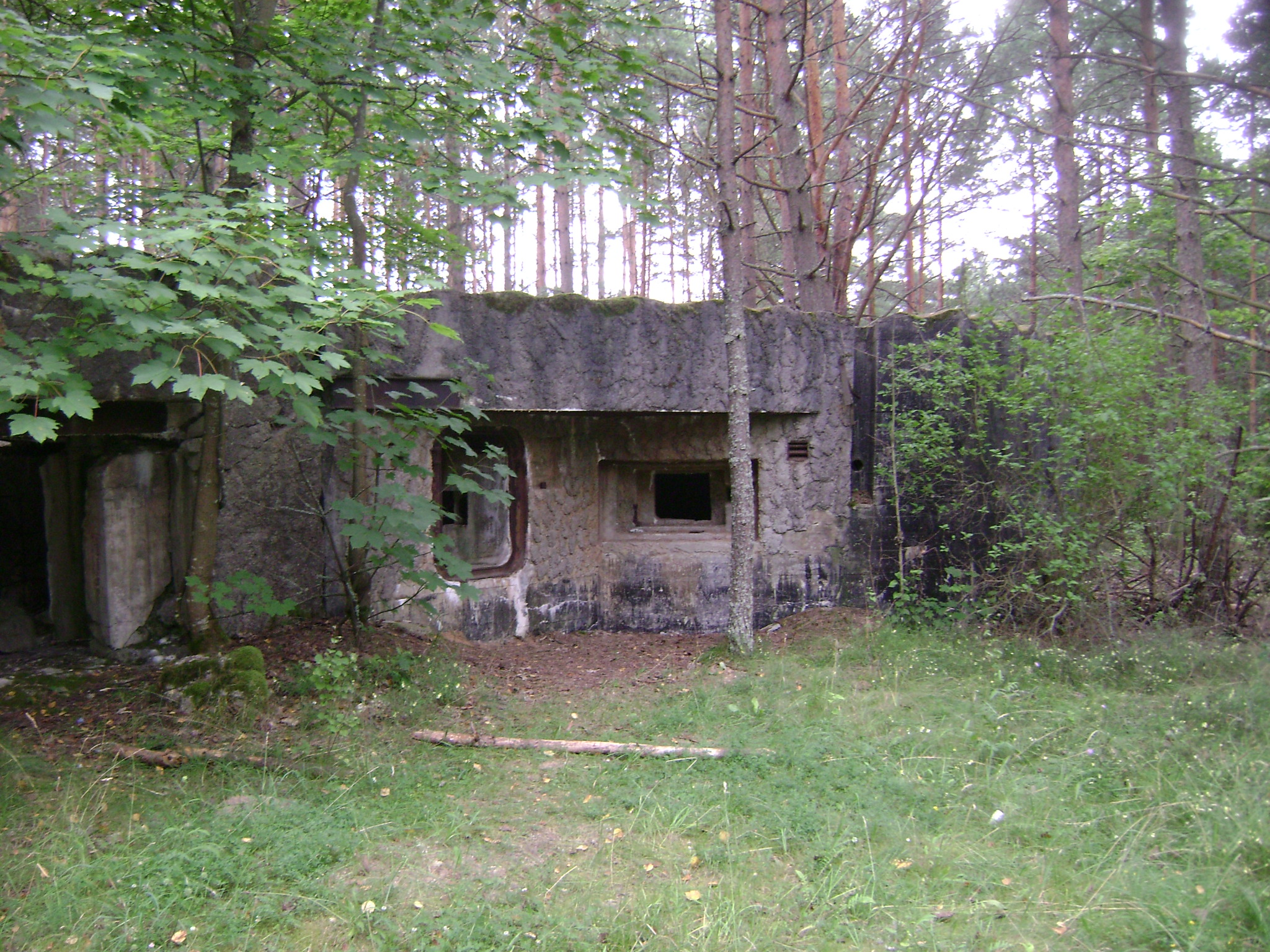

- Location within Poland
- Coordinates: 53°34′55″N 20°38′14″E
- Country: Poland
- Voivodeship: Warmian-Masurian
- County: Szczytno
- Gmina: Jedwabno
- Elevation: 154 m (505 ft)
- Population: 25

Czarny Piec [ˈt͡ʂarnɨ ˈpjɛt͡s] is a village in the administrative district of Gmina Jedwabno, within Szczytno County, Warmian-Masurian Voivodeship, in northern Poland.

The village has a population of 25.
