= Rybaczówka =

- Settlement
- Location within Poland
- Coordinates: 53°33′59″N 20°28′55″E
- Country: Poland
- Voivodeship: Warmian-Masurian
- County: Olsztyn
- Gmina: Olsztynek

Rybaczówka [rɨbaˈt͡ʂufka] is a settlement in the administrative district of Gmina Olsztynek, within Olsztyn County, Warmian-Masurian Voivodeship, in northern Poland.
