= Malinowo, Olsztyn County =

Malinowo
- Village
- Location within Poland
- Coordinates: 53°28′51″N 20°21′37″E
- Country: Poland
- Voivodeship: Warmian-Masurian
- County: Olsztyn
- Gmina: Olsztynek

Malinowo [maliˈnɔvɔ] is a village in the administrative district of Gmina Olsztynek, within Olsztyn County, Warmian-Masurian Voivodeship, in northern Poland.
