= Mierki =

- Village
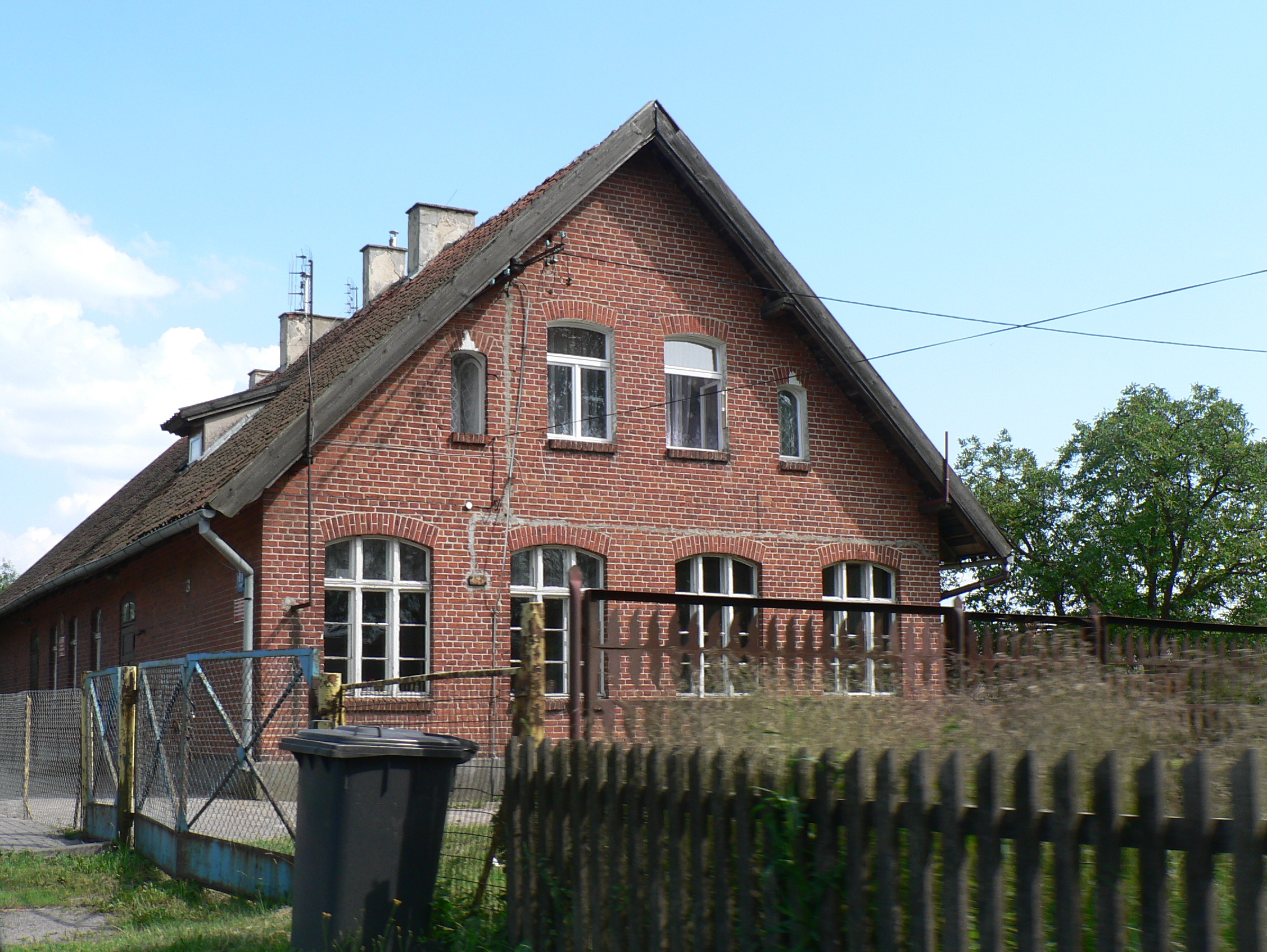

- Location within Poland
- Coordinates: 53°35′N 20°19′E
- Country: Poland
- Voivodeship: Warmian-Masurian
- County: Olsztyn
- Gmina: Olsztynek
- Population: 350

Mierki [ˈmjɛrki] is a village in the administrative district of Gmina Olsztynek, within Olsztyn County, Warmian-Masurian Voivodeship, in northern Poland.
