= Orzechowo, Gmina Olsztynek =

Orzechowo
- Village
- Location within Poland
- Coordinates: 53°33′46″N 20°26′53″E
- Country: Poland
- Voivodeship: Warmian-Masurian
- County: Olsztyn
- Gmina: Olsztynek
- Population: 154

Orzechowo [ɔʐɛˈxɔvɔ] is a village in the administrative district of Gmina Olsztynek, within Olsztyn County, Warmian-Masurian Voivodeship, in northern Poland.

Orzechowo is known for its neogothic church.
