= Dzierzki =

- Village
- Location within Poland
- Coordinates: 53°32′57″N 20°51′4″E
- Country: Poland
- Voivodeship: Warmian-Masurian
- County: Szczytno
- Gmina: Jedwabno
- Population: 180

Dzierzki [ˈd͡ʑɛʂki] (German: Althöfen) is a village in the administrative district of Gmina Jedwabno, within Szczytno County, Warmian-Masurian Voivodeship, in northern Poland.

As of 2016, the village had a population of approximately 180.
