= Brajniki =

- Village
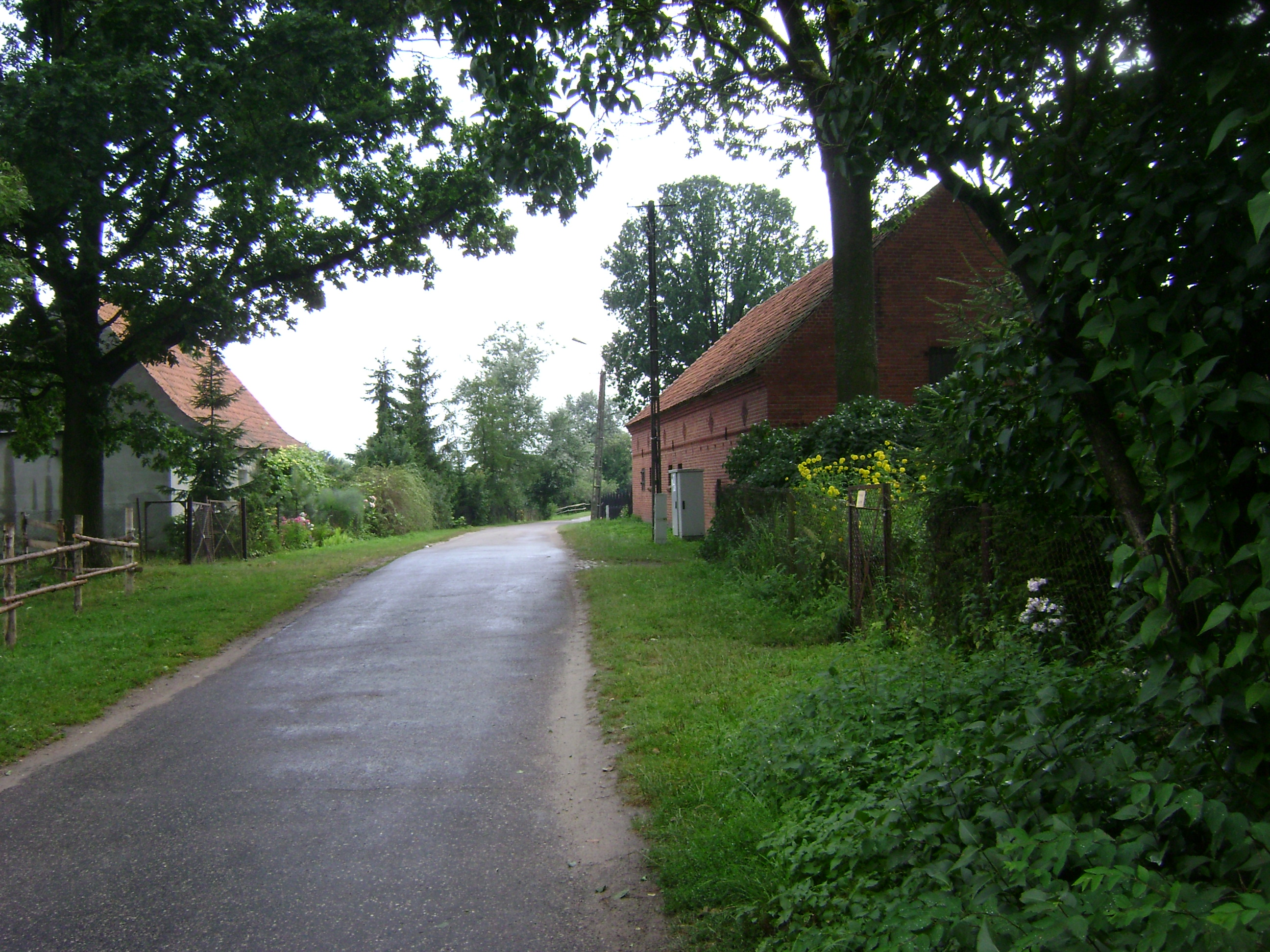

- Location within Poland
- Coordinates: 53°34′N 20°49′E
- Country: Poland
- Voivodeship: Warmian-Masurian
- County: Szczytno
- Gmina: Jedwabno

Brajniki [brai̯ˈniki] (German: Braynicken) is a village in the administrative district of Gmina Jedwabno, within Szczytno County, Warmian-Masurian Voivodeship, in northern Poland.
