= Swaderki =

- Village
- Location within Poland
- Coordinates: 53°34′N 20°26′E
- Country: Poland
- Voivodeship: Warmian-Masurian
- County: Olsztyn
- Gmina: Olsztynek
- Postal code: 11-015

Swaderki [sfaˈdɛrki] is a village in the administrative district of Gmina Olsztynek, within Olsztyn County, Warmian-Masurian Voivodeship, in northern Poland.
