= Gąsiorowo Olsztyneckie =

- Village
- Location within Poland
- Coordinates: 53°30′51″N 20°16′18″E
- Country: Poland
- Voivodeship: Warmian-Masurian
- County: Olsztyn
- Gmina: Olsztynek

Gąsiorowo Olsztyneckie [ɡɔ̃ɕɔˈrɔvɔ ɔlʂtɨˈnɛt͡skʲɛ] is a village in the administrative district of Gmina Olsztynek, within Olsztyn County, Warmian-Masurian Voivodeship, in northern Poland.
