= Witówko =

- Village
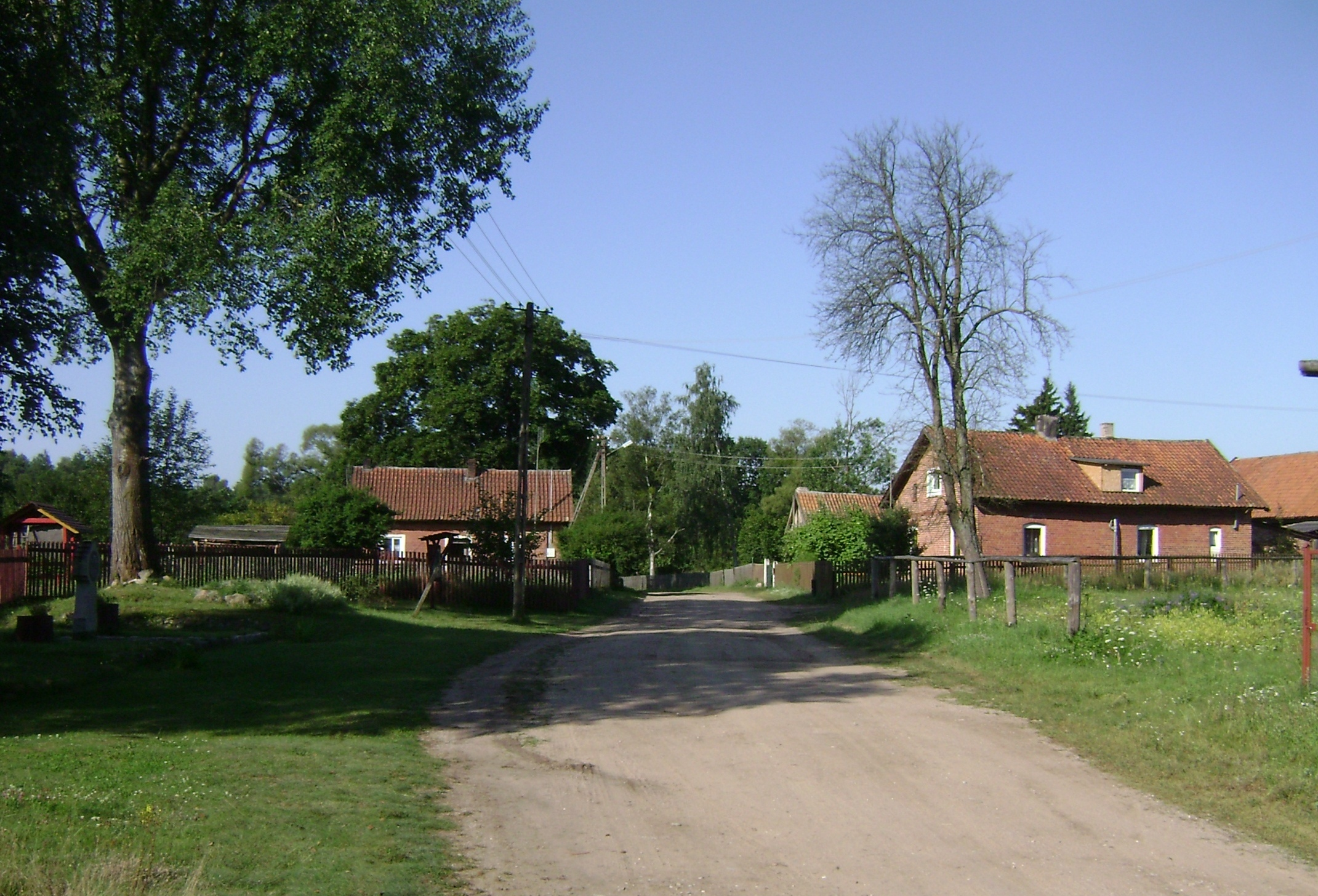

- Location within Poland
- Coordinates: 53°33′N 20°53′E
- Country: Poland
- Voivodeship: Warmian-Masurian
- County: Szczytno
- Gmina: Jedwabno

Witówko [viˈtufkɔ] (German: Ittowken) is a village in the administrative district of Gmina Jedwabno, within Szczytno County, Warmian-Masurian Voivodeship, in northern Poland.
