= Maróz =

- Village
- Location within Poland
- Coordinates: 53°31′N 20°24′E
- Country: Poland
- Voivodeship: Warmian-Masurian
- County: Olsztyn
- Gmina: Olsztynek
- ZIP Code: 11–015

Maróz [ˈmarus] is a village in the administrative district of Gmina Olsztynek, within Olsztyn County, Warmian-Masurian Voivodeship, in northern Poland.
