= Dębowiec, Szczytno County =

Dębowiec
- Village
- Location within Poland
- Coordinates: 53°29′N 20°43′E
- Country: Poland
- Voivodeship: Warmian-Masurian
- County: Szczytno
- Gmina: Jedwabno
- Population: 22

Dębowiec [dɛmˈbɔvjɛt͡s] (German: Dembowitz) is a village in the administrative district of Gmina Jedwabno, within Szczytno County, Warmian-Masurian Voivodeship, in northern Poland.
