= Juńcza =

- Village
- Location within Poland
- Coordinates: 53°33′47″N 20°16′08″E
- Country: Poland
- Voivodeship: Warmian-Masurian
- County: Olsztyn
- Gmina: Olsztynek

Juńcza [ˈjuɲt͡ʂa] is a village in the administrative district of Gmina Olsztynek, within Olsztyn County, Warmian-Masurian Voivodeship, in northern Poland.
