= Selwa, Warmian-Masurian Voivodeship =

Selwa
- Village
- Location within Poland
- Coordinates: 53°31′38″N 20°26′51″E
- Country: Poland
- Voivodeship: Warmian-Masurian
- County: Olsztyn
- Gmina: Olsztynek
- Population: 60

Selwa [ˈsɛlva] is a village in the administrative district of Gmina Olsztynek, within Olsztyn County, Warmian-Masurian Voivodeship, in northern Poland.
