= Narty, Warmian-Masurian Voivodeship =

Narty
- Village
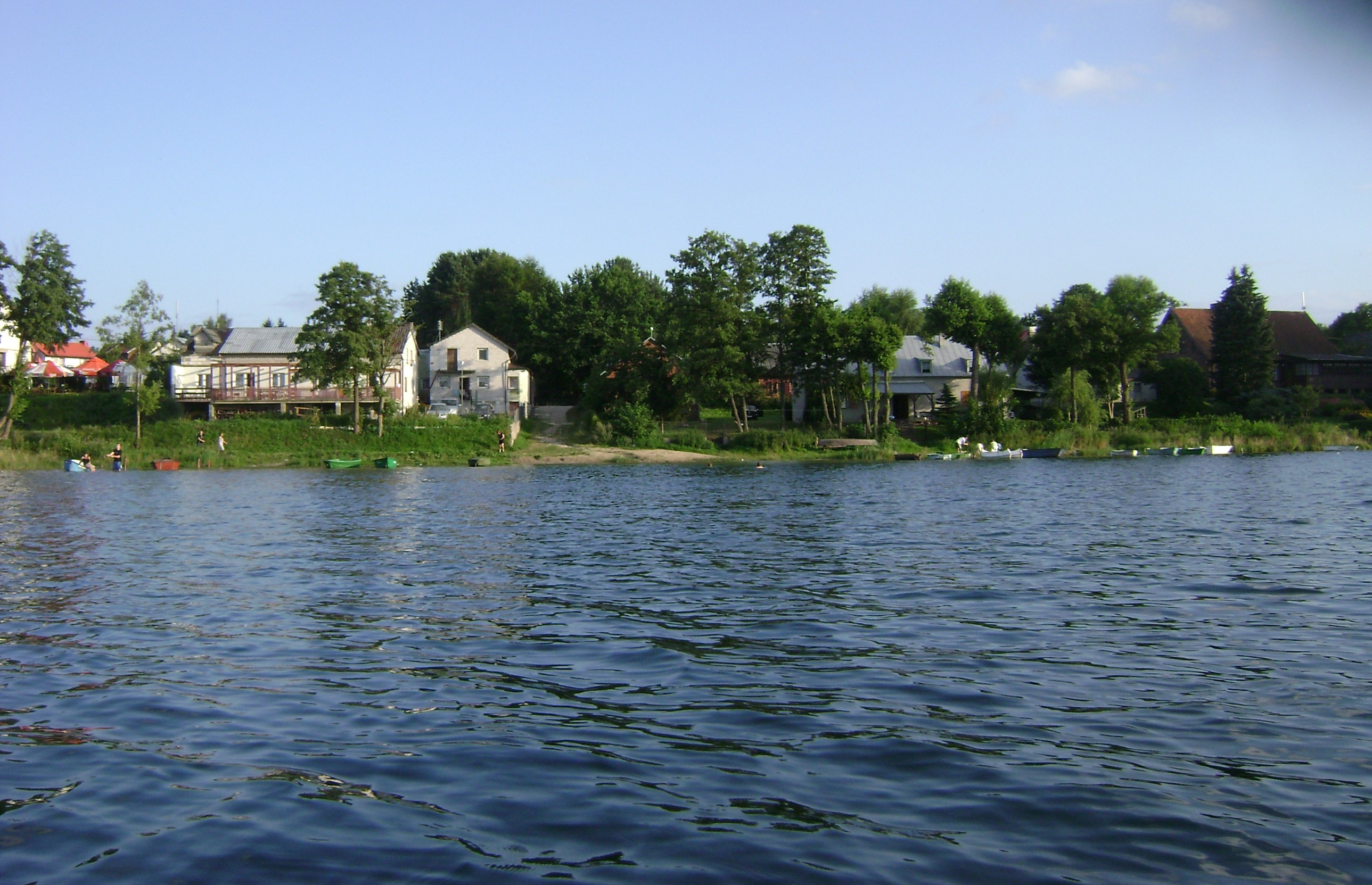

- Location within Poland
- Coordinates: 53°33′N 20°47′E
- Country: Poland
- Voivodeship: Warmian-Masurian
- County: Szczytno
- Gmina: Jedwabno

Narty [ˈnartɨ] (German: Narthen) is a village in the administrative district of Gmina Jedwabno, within Szczytno County, Warmian-Masurian Voivodeship, in northern Poland.

The area used to be a part of East Prussia, which was a fiefdom of Poland. The village was established by Stanislaw Witkowski in 1571
