= Dłużek, Warmian-Masurian Voivodeship =

Dłużek
- Village
- Location within Poland
- Coordinates: 53°33′N 20°41′E
- Country: Poland
- Voivodeship: Warmian-Masurian
- County: Szczytno
- Gmina: Jedwabno

Dłużek [ˈdwuʐɛk] (German: Hartigswalde) is a village in the administrative district of Gmina Jedwabno, in Szczytno County, Warmian-Masurian Voivodeship, in northern Poland.
