= Małszewo =

- Village
- Location within Poland
- Coordinates: 53°34′N 20°42′E
- Country: Poland
- Voivodeship: Warmian-Masurian
- County: Szczytno
- Gmina: Jedwabno

Małszewo [mau̯ˈʂɛvɔ] (German: Malschöwen; 1938-45 Malshöfen) is a village in the administrative district of Gmina Jedwabno, within Szczytno County, Warmian-Masurian Voivodeship, in northern Poland.
