= Pawłowo, Olsztyn County =

Pawłowo
- Village
- Location within Poland
- Coordinates: 53°32′N 20°16′E
- Country: Poland
- Voivodeship: Warmian-Masurian
- County: Olsztyn
- Gmina: Olsztynek
- Population: 195

Pawłowo [paˈvwɔvɔ] is a village in the administrative district of Gmina Olsztynek, within Olsztyn County, Warmian-Masurian Voivodeship, in northern Poland.
