= Ameryka, Warmian-Masurian Voivodeship =

Ameryka
- Village
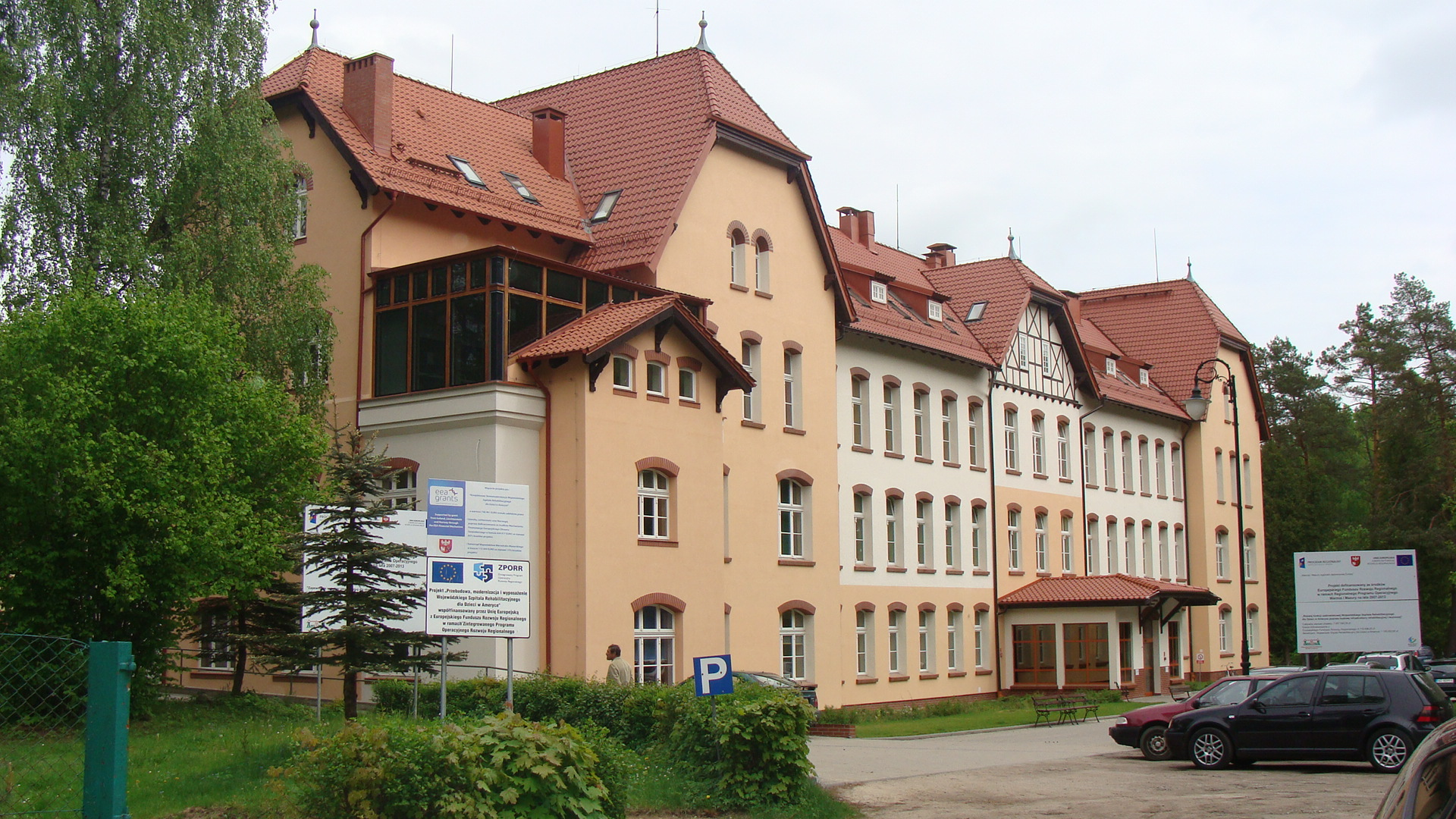
- Children's rehabilitation hospital

- Location within Poland
- Coordinates: 53°36′28″N 20°18′58″E
- Country: Poland
- Voivodeship: Warmian-Masurian
- County: Olsztyn
- Gmina: Olsztynek

Population
  - Total: 100

Ameryka [amɛˈrɨka] is a village in the administrative district of Gmina Olsztynek, within Olsztyn County, Warmian-Masurian Voivodeship, in northern Poland.

It is the site of a children's rehabilitation hospital.
