= Gmina Olsztynek =

Gmina Olsztynek Olsztynek Commune
- Gmina
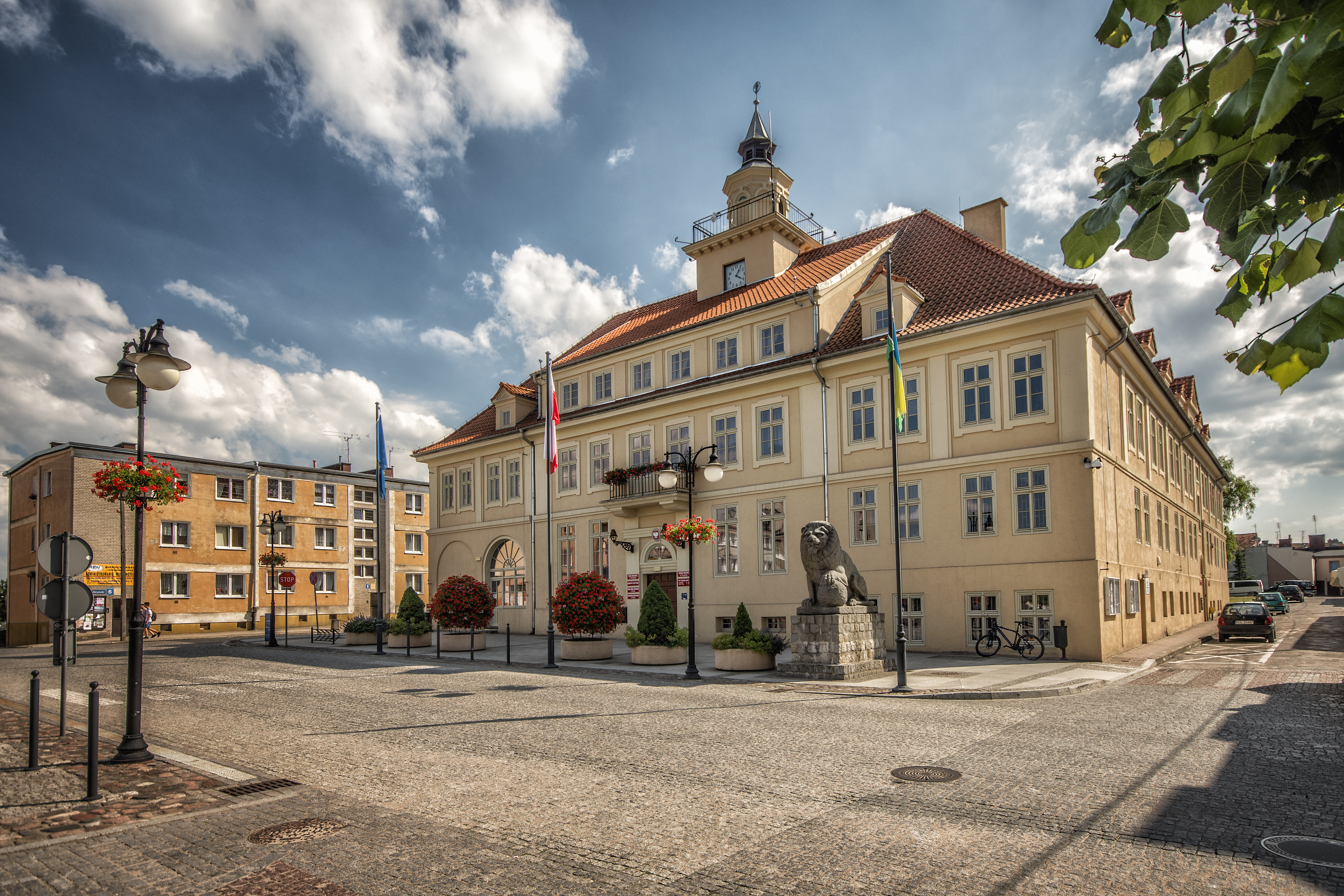
- Town Hall in Olsztynek, seat of the gmina office

- Flag Coat of arms
- Interactive map of Gmina Olsztynek
- Coordinates (Olsztynek): 53°35′N 20°17′E
- Country: Poland
- Voivodeship: Warmian-Masurian
- County: Olsztyn County
- Seat: Olsztynek

Area
  - Total: 372.03 km^{2} (143.64 sq mi)

Population (2006)
  - Total: 13,666
  - Density: 36.734/km^{2} (95.140/sq mi)
  - Urban: 7,591
  - Rural: 6,075
- Time zone: UTC+1 (CET)
  - Summer (DST): UTC+2 (CEST)
- Vehicle registration: NOL
- Website: http://www.olsztynek.bil-wm.pl/

Gmina Olsztynek is an urban-rural gmina (administrative district) in Olsztyn County, Warmian-Masurian Voivodeship, in northern Poland. Its seat is the town of Olsztynek, which lies approximately 27 kilometres (17 mi) south-west of the regional capital Olsztyn.

The gmina covers an area of 372.03 square kilometres (143.6 sq mi), and as of 2006 its total population is 13,666 (out of which the population of Olsztynek amounts to 7,591, and the population of the rural part of the gmina is 6,075).

== Villages ==
Apart from the town of Olsztynek, Gmina Olsztynek contains the villages and settlements of:

- Ameryka
- Cichogrąd
- Czarci Jar
- Czerwona Woda
- Dąb
- Dębowa Góra
- Drwęck
- Elgnówko
- Gaj
- Gąsiorowo Olsztyneckie
- Gębiny
- Gibała
- Jadamowo
- Jagiełek
- Jemiołowo
- Juńcza
- Kąpity
- Kolatek
- Królikowo
- Kunki
- Kurki
- Łęciny
- Lichtajny
- Lipowo Kurkowskie
- Lutek
- Łutynówko
- Łutynowo
- Makruty
- Malinowo
- Mańki
- Marązy
- Maróz
- Marózek
- Mierki
- Mycyny
- Nadrowo
- Nowa Wieś Ostródzka
- Orzechowo
- Pawłowo
- Platyny
- Ruda Waplewska
- Rybaczówka
- Samagowo
- Selwa
- Sitno
- Smolanek
- Spoguny
- Stare Gaje
- Sudwa
- Swaderki
- Świerkocin
- Świętajńska Karczma
- Świętajny
- Tolejny
- Tolkmity
- Tomaszyn
- Waplewo
- Warglewo
- Warlity Małe
- Waszeta
- Wigwałd
- Wilkowo
- Witramowo
- Witułty
- Ząbie
- Zawady
- Zezuty

== Neighbouring gminas ==
Gmina Olsztynek is bordered by the gminas of Gietrzwałd, Grunwald, Jedwabno, Kozłowo, Nidzica, Ostróda, Purda and Stawiguda.
