= Rekownica, Warmian-Masurian Voivodeship =

Rekownica
- Village
- Location within Poland
- Coordinates: 53°29′N 20°49′E
- Country: Poland
- Voivodeship: Warmian-Masurian
- County: Szczytno
- Gmina: Jedwabno

Rekownica [rɛkɔvˈnit͡sa] (German: Großwalde) is a village in the administrative district of Gmina Jedwabno, within Szczytno County, Warmian-Masurian Voivodeship, in northern Poland.

The village was created by a fisherman named Eugen Gross or Grosz, who on 12 March 1710 received 16 łans and 8 morgen of land from a local forest master Rudolf Wilhelm von Lüderitz. The village was conveniently located close to the shores of three lakes: Głęboczek, Rekowe and Bakola (the latter ceased to exist some time in the 19th century). The village was created in accordance with the mediaeval Kulm law and was exempted from taxes for some time, to attract more settlers, mostly from northern Masovia.

A 1780 census listed 12 peasants living in the village, two years later a Prussian village inventory recorded 26 houses in Rekownitza. By 1817 the village grew to 158 inhabitants. In 1858 the village had 42 houses and covered the area of 81.5 łans.

In 1923 the local inhabitants started a volunteer fire service, in 1941 a new fire station was built. In 1939 the village included 57 farmsteads (90 buildings altogether), including 13 larger ones. There were 385 inhabitants in 1939.

During World War II the village was badly damaged by warfare in 1944 and 1945. After the war it was partly rebuilt, nowadays its permanent population does not exceed 76 people, many more go there during the summer months.
