= Lutek =

- Village
- Location within Poland
- Coordinates: 53°31′26″N 20°18′12″E
- Country: Poland
- Voivodeship: Warmian-Masurian
- County: Olsztyn
- Gmina: Olsztynek
- Population: 70

Lutek [ˈlutɛk] is a village in the administrative district of Gmina Olsztynek, within Olsztyn County, Warmian-Masurian Voivodeship, in northern Poland.
