= Warlity Małe =

- Village
- Location within Poland
- Coordinates: 53°35′52″N 20°10′15″E
- Country: Poland
- Voivodeship: Warmian-Masurian
- County: Olsztyn
- Gmina: Olsztynek

Warlity Małe [varˈlitɨ ˈmawɛ] is a village in the administrative district of Gmina Olsztynek, within Olsztyn County, Warmian-Masurian Voivodeship, in northern Poland.
