= Szűcs =

Szűcs is a Hungarian surname meaning 'furrier'. Notable people with the surname include:

- Csaba Szűcs (born 1965), Hungarian marathon runner
- Csaba Szücs (born 1987), Slovak handball player
- Dóra Szűcs, Hungarian politician
- Erika Szűcs (born 1951), Hungarian politician and economist
- Gábor Szűcs (born 1956), Hungarian cyclist
- Gabriella Szűcs (handballer) (born 1984), Romanian-born Hungarian handball player
- Gabriella Szűcs (water polo) (born 1988), Hungarian water polo player
- György Szűcs (1912–1991), Hungarian footballer
- István Szűcs (born 1985), Hungarian footballer
- Jenő Szűcs (1928–1988), Hungarian historian
- Kornél Szűcs (born 2001), Hungarian footballer
- Lajos Szűcs (footballer, born 1943) (1943–2020), Hungarian footballer
- Lajos Szűcs (footballer, born 1973), Hungarian footballer
- Lajos Szűcs (politician) (born 1964), Hungarian politician
- Lajos Szűcs (weightlifter) (1946–1999), Hungarian weightlifter
- László Szűcs (born 1991), Hungarian footballer
- Sándor Szűcs (1921–1951), Hungarian footballer

== See also ==
- Szuć, a village in Poland
- Szúcs, a municipality and village in Hungary
