= Dębowa Góra, Warmian-Masurian Voivodeship =

Dębowa Góra
- Location within Poland
- Coordinates: 53°31′25″N 20°14′12″E
- Country: Poland
- Voivodeship: Warmian-Masurian
- County: Olsztyn
- Gmina: Olsztynek

Dębowa Góra [dɛmˈbɔva ˈɡura] is a village in the administrative district of Gmina Olsztynek, within Olsztyn County, Warmian-Masurian Voivodeship, in northern Poland.
