= Burdąg =

- Village
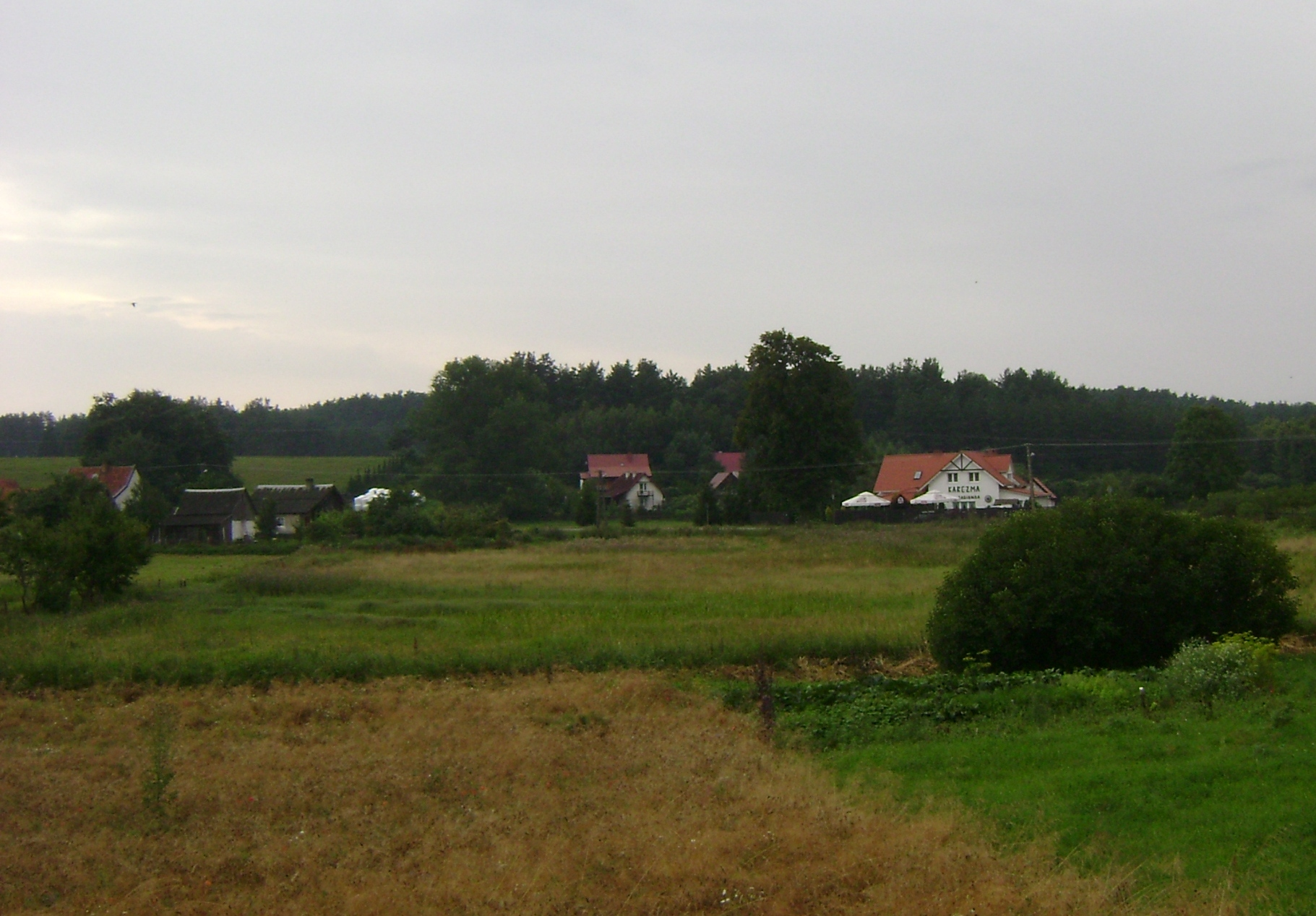

- Location within Poland
- Coordinates: 53°34′13.48″N 20°44′25.67″E
- Country: Poland
- Voivodeship: Warmian-Masurian
- County: Szczytno
- Gmina: Jedwabno

Burdąg (Polish: [ˈburdɔŋk]; German: Burdungen) is a village in the administrative district of Gmina Jedwabno, within Szczytno County, Warmian-Masurian Voivodeship, in northern Poland.
