= Szuć =

- Village
- Location within Poland
- Coordinates: 53°30′21″N 20°43′58″E
- Country: Poland
- Voivodeship: Warmian-Masurian
- County: Szczytno
- Gmina: Jedwabno
- Elevation: 132 m (433 ft)
- Population: 244

Szuć [ˈʂut͡ɕ] (German: Schuttschen) is a village in the administrative district of Gmina Jedwabno, within Szczytno County, Warmian-Masurian Voivodeship, in northern Poland.

In the Middle Ages there was a settlement of Yotvingians in the area. The village name comes from the Old Prussian word Suckans, meaning "fish".

In 2007 the village had a population of 244.
