= Waplewo, Szczytno County =

Waplewo
- Village
- Location within Poland
- Coordinates: 53°36′N 20°45′E
- Country: Poland
- Voivodeship: Warmian-Masurian
- County: Szczytno
- Gmina: Jedwabno

Waplewo [vaˈplɛvɔ] (German: Waplitz) is a village in the administrative district of Gmina Jedwabno, within Szczytno County, Warmian-Masurian Voivodeship, in northern Poland.
