= Kurki, Olsztyn County =

Kurki
- Village
- Location within Poland
- Coordinates: 53°33′N 20°29′E
- Country: Poland
- Voivodeship: Warmian-Masurian
- County: Olsztyn
- Gmina: Olsztynek

Kurki [ˈkurki] is a village in the administrative district of Gmina Olsztynek, within Olsztyn County, Warmian-Masurian Voivodeship, in northern Poland.
