= Gibała =

- Village
- Location within Poland
- Coordinates: 53°34′57″N 20°08′57″E
- Country: Poland
- Voivodeship: Warmian-Masurian
- County: Olsztyn
- Gmina: Olsztynek

Gibała [ɡiˈbawa] is a village in the administrative district of Gmina Olsztynek, within Olsztyn County, Warmian-Masurian Voivodeship, in northern Poland.
