= Stalag I-B =

- Hohenstein, East Prussia (now Olsztynek, Poland)
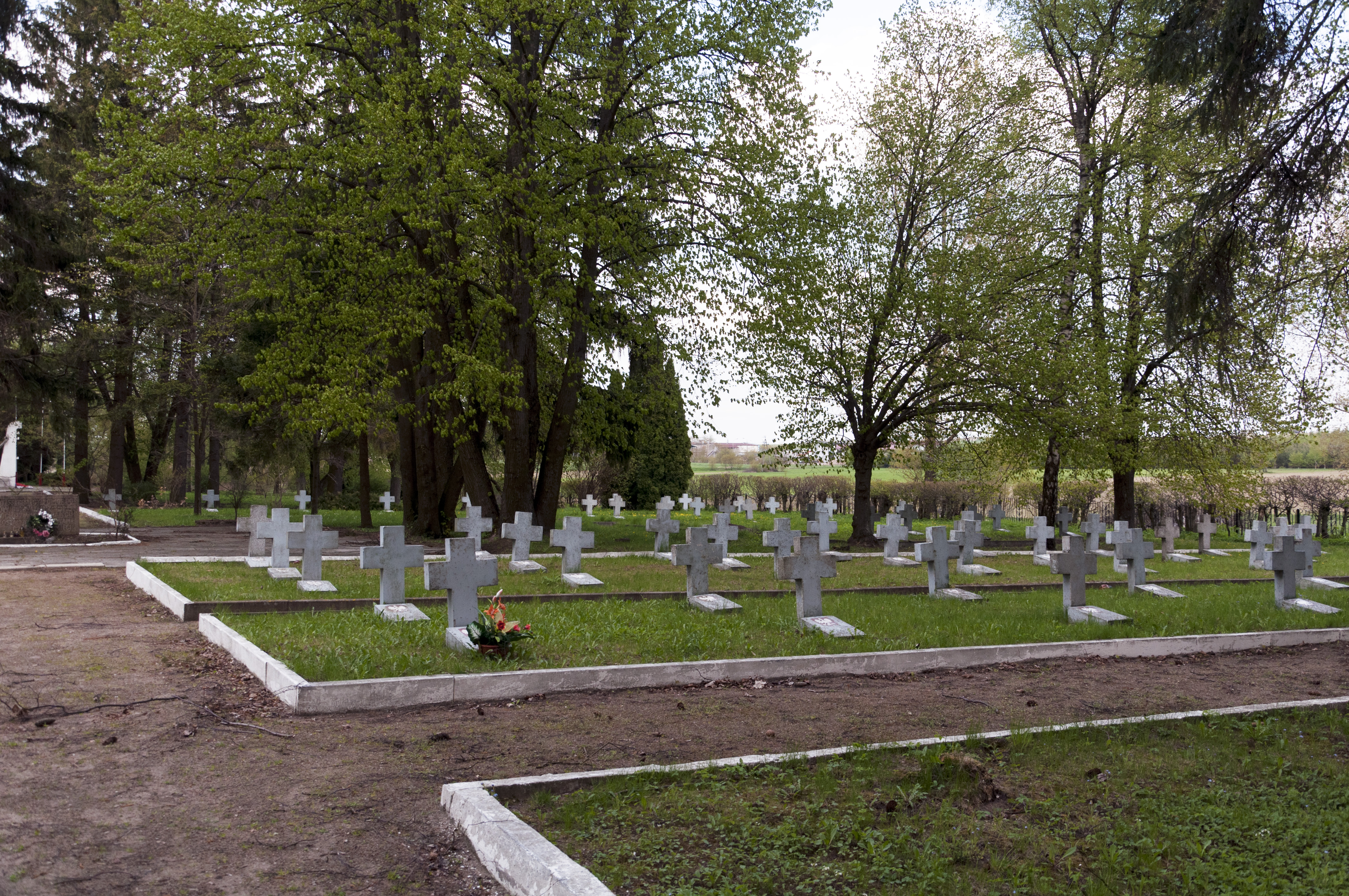
- Stalag I-B's cemetery in Sudwa, with mass graves of Polish and Soviet prisoners

Site information
- Type: Prisoner-of-war camp
- Controlled by: Nazi Germany

Location
- Hohenstein, Germany (pre-war borders, 1937)
- Location within Poland Location within Germany
- Coordinates: 53.58068°N 20.25414°E

Site history
- In use: 1939–1945
- Battles/wars: World War II

Garrison information
- Occupants: Polish, Belgian, French, Italian, Serbian and Soviet prisoners of war

Stalag I-B Hohenstein was a German World War II prisoner-of-war camp located 2 kilometres (1.2 mi) west of Hohenstein, East Prussia (now Olsztynek, Poland).

The camp was partially located on the grounds of the Tannenberg Memorial and initially included a set of wooden structures intended to house World War I veterans during German Nazi festivities.

Established in 1939 to house Polish soldiers captured in the course of the September Campaign, with time it was extended to house also Belgians, French, Italian, Serbian and Soviet soldiers. Harsh conditions, malnutrition, maltreatment and recurring typhoid epidemics led to many deaths among the prisoners. Notably during the winter of 1941–42 roughly 25,000 people died there, mostly Soviet soldiers.

It is estimated that altogether 650,000 people passed through this camp and its sub-camps. Between 50 and 55 thousand of them were buried in 500 mass graves at the Sudwa cemetery located nearby. The site is commemorated with a memorial stone by Ryszard Wachowski. Since 1980 the Olsztynek-based municipal museum hosts a small exhibition devoted to the camp and its inmates.

Parts of the former camp were uncovered during construction of the S7 Expressway.

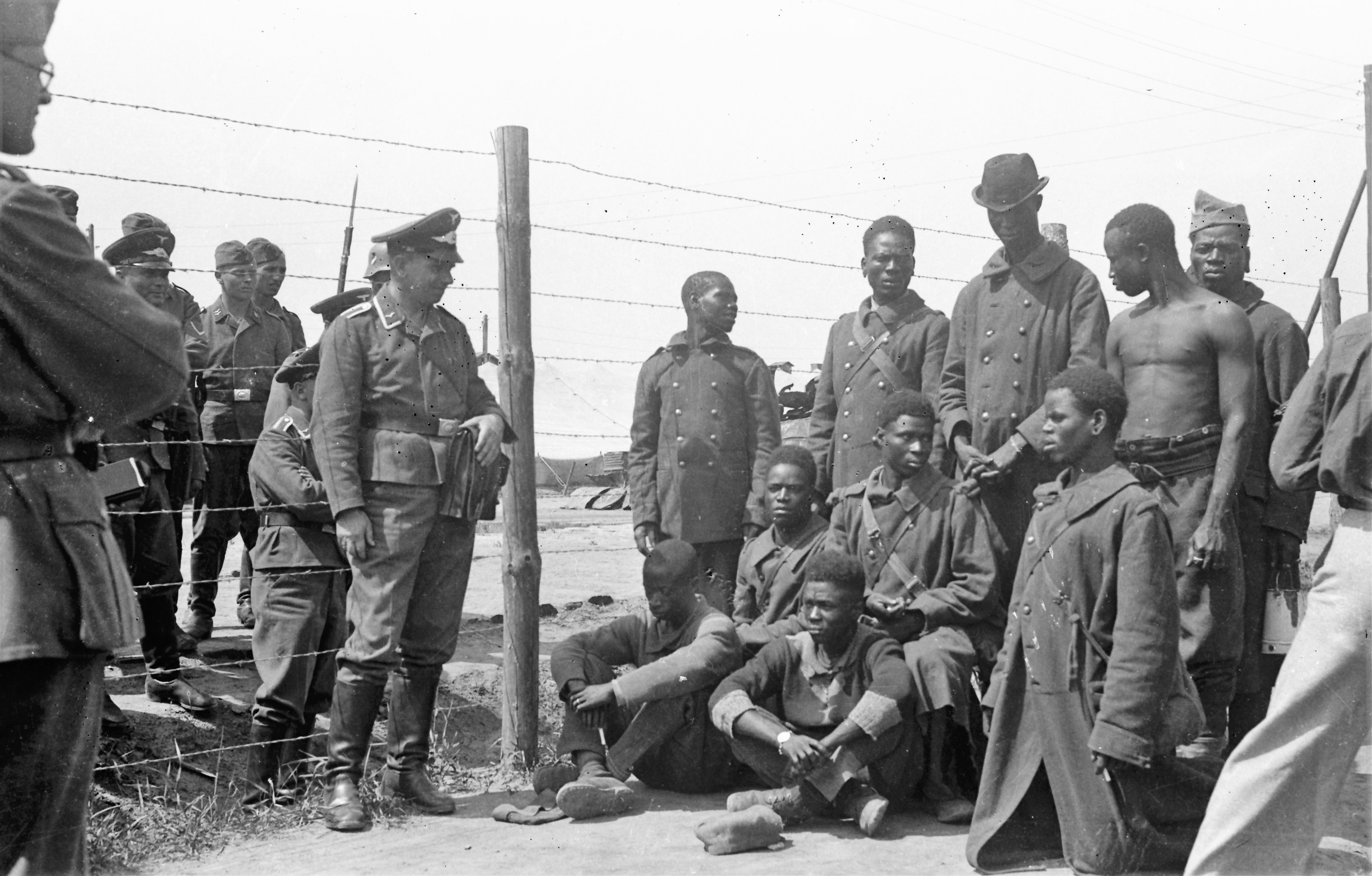
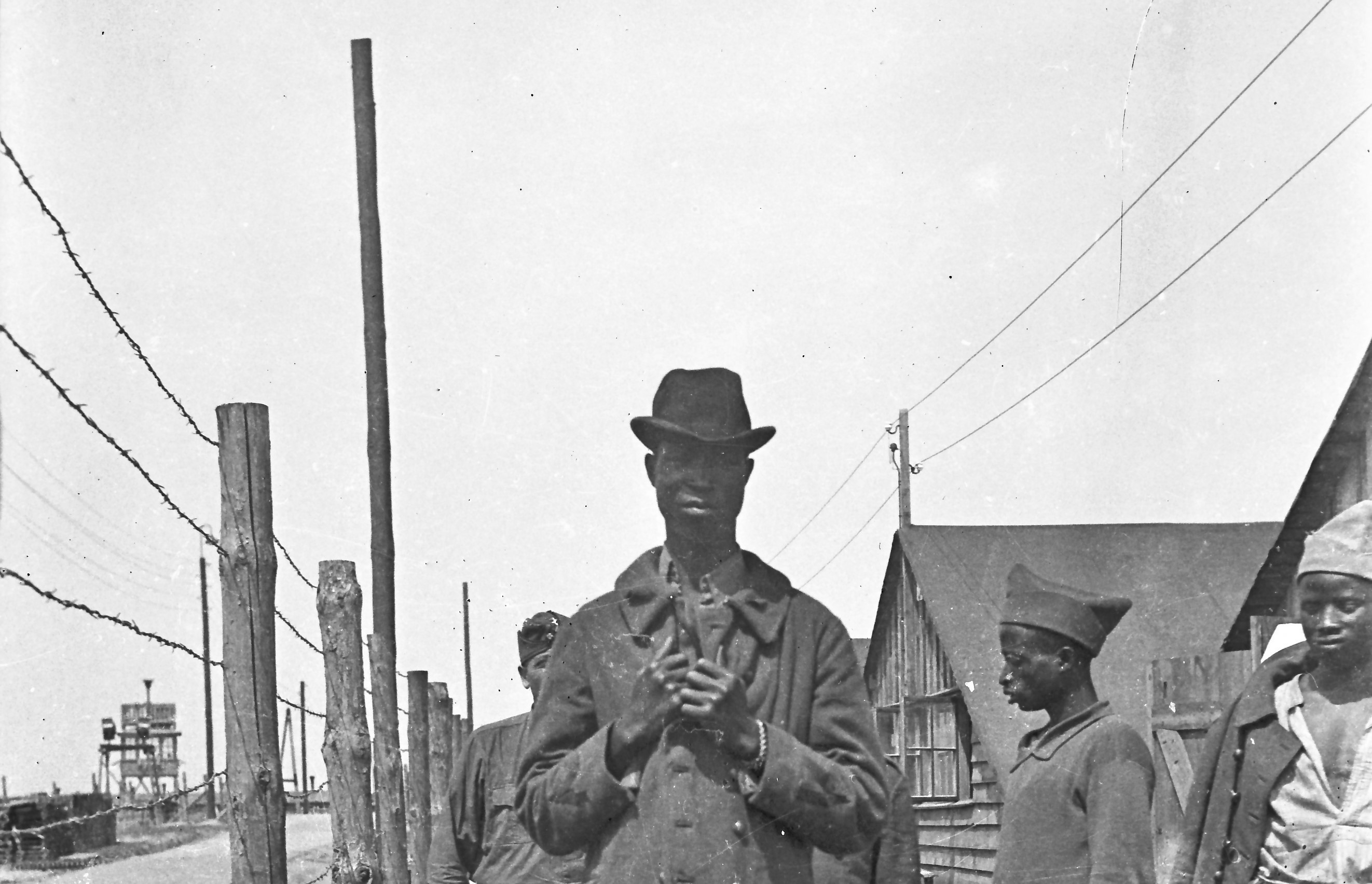
Prisoners from French West Africa (probably around January 1945 [To be verified, Poland was liberated in January 1945].)
