= Szúcs =

- Village (község)
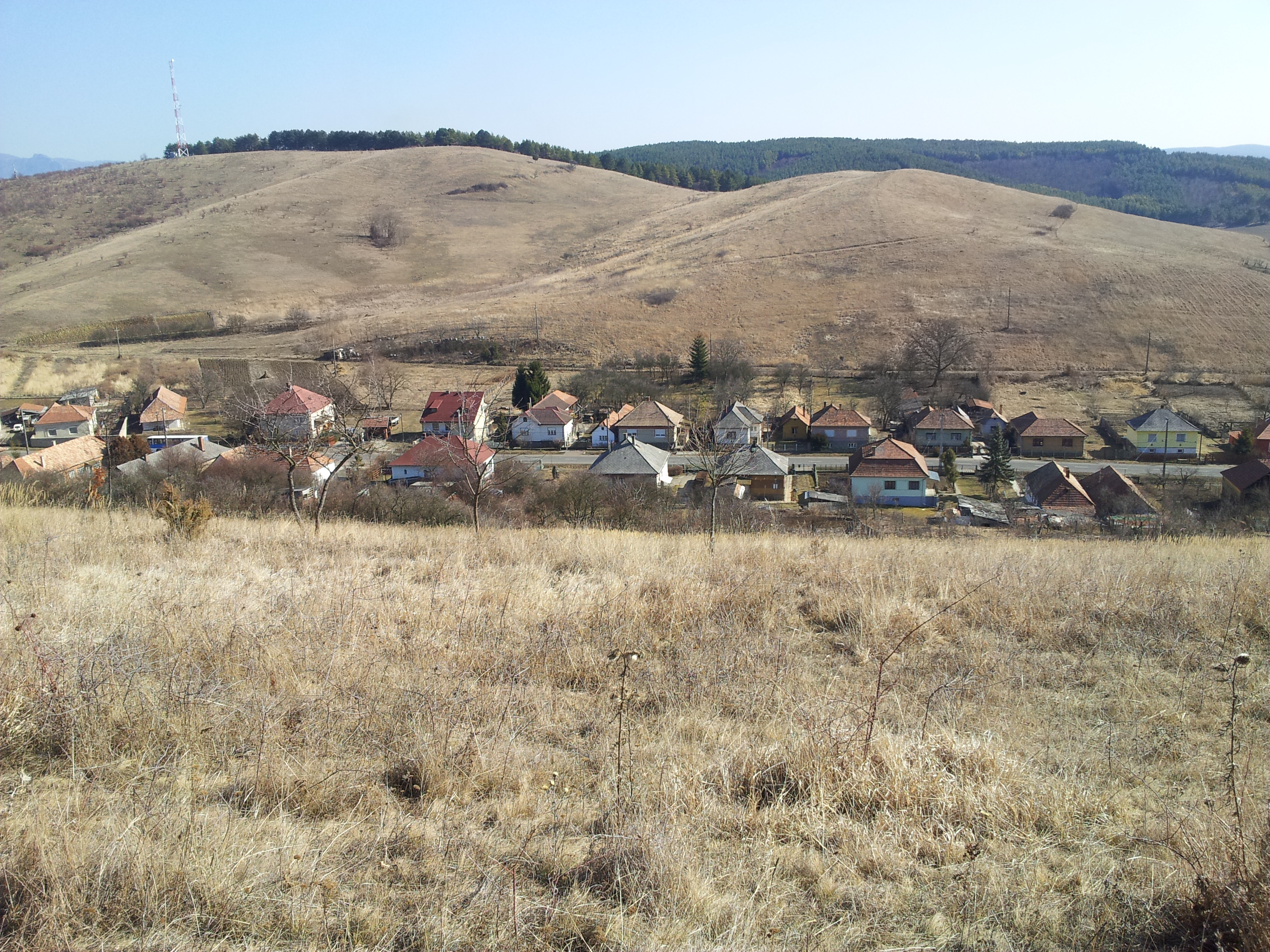

- Coat of arms

- Location of Heves County in Hungary

- Location in Hungary
- Coordinates: 48°02′49″N 20°14′53″E
- Country: Hungary
- Region: Northern Hungary
- County: Heves County
- District: Eger

Government
  - Mayor: Egyed Zsigmond (Ind.)

Area
  - Total: 8.49 km^{2} (3.28 sq mi)

Population (2015)
  - Total: 424
  - Density: 49.9/km^{2} (129/sq mi)
- Time zone: UTC+1 (CET)
  - Summer (DST): UTC+2 (CEST)
- Postal code: 3341
- Area code: 36
- Website: www.szucs.hu

Szúcs is a village in Heves County, Hungary.
