= Pope John Paul II =

Head of the Catholic Church from 1978 to 2005

Pope Saint John Paul II
- Bishop of Rome
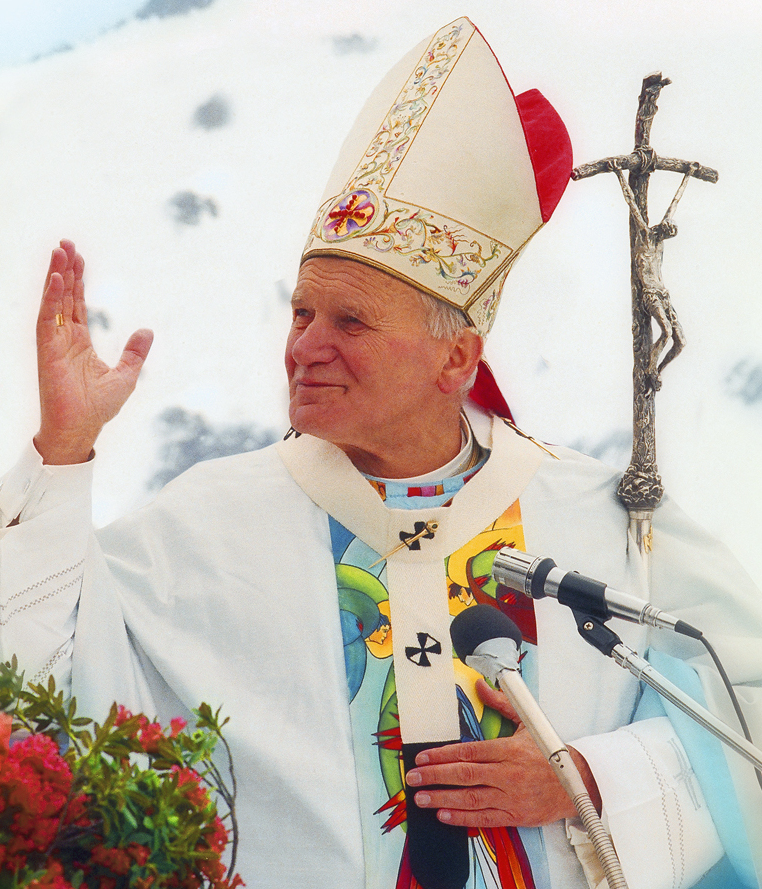
- John Paul II in 1988
- Church: Catholic Church
- Papacy began: 16 October 1978
- Papacy ended: 2 April 2005
- Predecessor: John Paul I
- Successor: Benedict XVI
- Previous posts: Titular Bishop of Ombi (1958‍–‍1964); Auxiliary Bishop of Kraków (1958‍–‍1964); Archbishop of Kraków (1964‍–‍1978); Cardinal Priest of San Cesareo in Palatio (1967‍–‍1978)

Orders
- Ordination: 1 November 1946 by Adam Stefan Sapieha
- Consecration: 28 September 1958 by Eugeniusz Baziak
- Created cardinal: 26 June 1967 by Paul VI
- Rank: Cardinal priest

Personal details
- Born: Karol Józef Wojtyła; 18 May 1920 Wadowice, Poland
- Died: 2 April 2005 (aged 84) Apostolic Palace, Vatican City
- Buried: Chapel of St. Sebastian, St. Peter's Basilica
- Education: Pontifical University of Saint Thomas Aquinas (PhL, PhD); Jagiellonian University (STD)
- Motto: Totus tuus (Latin for 'Totally yours')
- Signature: John Paul II's signature

- Coat of arms: John Paul II's coat of arms

Sainthood
- Feast day: 22 October
- Venerated in: Catholic Church
- Beatified: 1 May 2011; St. Peter's Square, Vatican City by Pope Benedict XVI
- Canonized: 27 April 2014; St. Peter's Square, Vatican City by Pope Francis
- Attributes: Papal vestments; Papal ferula
- Patronage: Poland; Archdiocese of Kraków; World Youth Day (co-patron); World Meeting of Families 2015 (co-patron); Young Catholics; Families; Świdnica; Trecastelli; Borgo Mantovano; Rivignano Teor; Paradahan, Tanza, Cavite (major patron)

Philosophical work
- Era: 20th-century philosophy
- Region: Western philosophy
- School: Personalism; Lublin Thomism
- Notable works: Love and Responsibility; Theology of the Body; 1983 Code of Canon Law (promulgated); Catechism of the Catholic Church (promulgated); Code of Canons of the Eastern Churches (promulgated); Fides et ratio; Memory and Identity
- Notable ideas: Culture of life and death; Mysteries of light (Note: The luminous mysteries seem to have their origin (although in a slightly different form) in the writings of Saint George Preca); Social mortgage; Theology of the Body

Ordination history
History
Diaconal ordination
- Ordained by: Adam Stefan Sapieha
- Date: 20 October 1946
Priestly ordination
- Ordained by: Adam Stefan Sapieha
- Date: 1 November 1946
- Place: Chapel of the Kraków Archbishop's residence
Episcopal consecration
- Principal consecrator: Eugeniusz Baziak
- Co-consecrators: Franciszek Jop; Bolesław Kominek
- Date: 28 September 1958
- Place: Wawel Cathedral, Kraków
Cardinalate
- Elevated by: Pope Paul VI
- Date: 26 June 1967
Episcopal succession
Bishops consecrated by Pope John Paul II as principal consecrator
- Piotr Longin Bednarczyk: 21 April 1968
- Józef Rozwadowski: 24 November 1968
- Stanislaw Smolenski: 5 April 1970
- Albin Małysiak: 5 April 1970
- Paweł Socha: 26 December 1973
- Józef Marek: 27 December 1973
- Franciszek Macharski: 6 January 1979
- Justo Mullor García: 27 May 1979
- Alfio Rapisarda: 27 May 1979
- Achille Silvestrini: 27 May 1979
- Samuel Seraphimov Djoundrine: 27 May 1979
- Rubén López Ardón: 27 May 1979
- Paulino Lukudu Loro: 27 May 1979
- Vincent Mojwok Nyiker: 27 May 1979
- Armido Gasparini: 27 May 1979
- Michael Hughes Kenny: 27 May 1979
- William Russell Houck: 27 May 1979
- José Cardoso Sobrinho: 27 May 1979
- Gerhard Ludwig Goebel: 27 May 1979
- Décio Pereira: 27 May 1979
- Fernando José Penteado: 27 May 1979
- Girolamo Grillo: 27 May 1979
- Paciano Aniceto: 27 May 1979
- Alan Basil de Lastic: 27 May 1979
- William Thomas Larkin: 27 May 1979
- John Joseph O'Connor: 27 May 1979
- Jean-Marie Lafontaine: 27 May 1979
- Ladislau Biernaski: 27 May 1979
- Newton Holanda Gurgel: 27 May 1979
- Matthew Harvey Clark: 27 May 1979
- Alejandro Goić Karmelić: 27 May 1979
- Pedro de Guzman Magugat: 27 May 1979
- Ramón López Carrozas: 27 May 1979
- Jozef Tomko: 15 September 1979
- Myroslav Ivan Lubachivsky: 12 November 1979
- Giovanni Coppa: 6 January 1980
- Carlo Maria Martini: 6 January 1980
- Christian Wiyghan Tumi: 6 January 1980
- Marcel Bam'ba Gongoa: 4 May 1980
- Louis Nkinga Bondala: 4 May 1980
- Laurent Monsengwo Pasinya: 4 May 1980
- Paride Taban: 4 May 1980
- Roger Mpungu: 4 May 1980
- Michel-Joseph-Gérard Gagnon: 4 May 1980
- Dominique Kimpinde Amando: 4 May 1980
- Joseph Nduhirubusa: 4 May 1980
- Vicente Joaquim Zico: 6 January 1981
- Sergio Goretti: 6 January 1981
- Giulio Sanguineti: 6 January 1981
- Francesco Voto: 6 January 1981
- Gregory Obinna Ochiagha: 6 January 1981
- Anicetus Bongsu Antonius Sinaga: 6 January 1981
- Lucas Luis Dónnelly Carey: 6 January 1981
- Filippo Giannini: 6 January 1981
- Ennio Appignanesi: 6 January 1981
- Martino Scarafile: 6 January 1981
- Alessandro Plotti: 6 January 1981
- Stanisław Szymecki: 12 April 1981
- Charles Louis Joseph Vandame: 6 January 1982
- John Bulaitis: 6 January 1982
- Traian Crişan: 6 January 1982
- Charles Kweku Sam: 6 January 1982
- Thomas Joseph O'Brien: 6 January 1982
- Antônio Alberto Guimarães Rezende: 6 January 1982
- Francis George Adeodatus Micallef: 6 January 1982
- Anthony Michael Milone: 6 January 1982
- Salim Sayegh: 6 January 1982
- Virgilio Noè: 6 March 1982
- Antonio Vitale Bommarco: 6 January 1983
- José Sebastián Laboa Gallego: 6 January 1983
- Karl-Josef Rauber: 6 January 1983
- Francesco Monterisi: 6 January 1983
- Kevin Joseph Aje: 6 January 1983
- John Olorunfemi Onaiyekan: 6 January 1983
- Pietro Rossano: 6 January 1983
- Anacleto Sima Ngua: 6 January 1983
- Ildefonso Obama Obono: 6 January 1983
- Jaroslav Škarvada: 6 January 1983
- Dominik Hrušovský: 6 January 1983
- Luigi del Gallo Roccagiovine: 6 January 1983
- Zenon Grocholewski: 6 January 1983
- Juliusz Paetz: 6 January 1983
- Alfons Maria Stickler: 1 November 1983
- Paolo Romeo: 6 January 1984
- Paul Kim Tchang-ryeol: 6 January 1984
- Polycarp Pengo: 6 January 1984
- Nicolas Okioh: 6 January 1984
- Eugenio Binini: 6 January 1984
- Ernest Kombo: 6 January 1984
- Jan Pieter Schotte: 6 January 1984
- Mathai Kochuparampil: 6 January 1984
- Domenico Pecile: 6 January 1984
- Bernard Patrick Devlin: 6 January 1985
- Kazimierz Górny: 6 January 1985
- Aloysius Balina: 6 January 1985
- Afonso Nteka: 6 January 1985
- Pellegrino Tomaso Ronchi: 6 January 1985
- Fernando Sáenz Lacalle: 6 January 1985
- Jorge Arturo Agustín Medina Estévez: 6 January 1985
- Justin Francis Rigali: 14 September 1985
- Pier Luigi Celata: 6 January 1986
- Franjo Komarica: 6 January 1986
- Walmir Alberto Valle: 6 January 1986
- Norbert Wendelin Mtega: 6 January 1986
- John Bosco Manat Chuabsamai: 6 January 1986
- Donald William Wuerl: 6 January 1986
- Felipe González González: 6 January 1986
- Józef Michalik: 16 October 1986
- Gilberto Agustoni: 6 January 1987
- Franc Perko: 6 January 1987
- Dino Monduzzi: 6 January 1987
- Joseph Sangval Surasarang: 6 January 1987
- Giorgio Biguzzi: 6 January 1987
- Benedict Dotu Sekey: 6 January 1987
- Julio Edgar Cabrera Ovalle: 6 January 1987
- William Jerome McCormack: 6 January 1987
- Emmanuel Alex Mapunda: 6 January 1987
- Dominic Su Haw Chiu: 6 January 1987
- John Magee: 17 March 1987
- Beniamino Stella: 5 September 1987
- René Pierre Louis Joseph Séjourné: 5 September 1987
- Giulio Nicolini: 5 September 1987
- Giovanni Battista Re: 7 November 1987
- Michel Sabbah: 6 January 1988
- Marian Oleś: 6 January 1988
- Emery Kabongo Kanundowi: 6 January 1988
- Luís d'Andrea: 6 January 1988
- Victor Adibe Chikwe: 6 January 1988
- Athanasius Atule Usuh: 6 January 1988
- José Raúl Vera López: 6 January 1988
- Srećko Badurina: 6 January 1988
- Luigi Belloli: 6 January 1988
- John Gavin Nolan: 6 January 1988
- Audrys Juozas Bačkis: 4 October 1988
- Giovanni Lajolo: 6 January 1989
- Pasquale Macchi: 6 January 1989
- Francesco Marchisano: 6 January 1989
- Justin Tetmu Samba: 6 January 1989
- John Mendes: 6 January 1989
- Leon Augustine Tharmaraj: 6 January 1989
- Tarcisius Ngalalekumtwa: 6 January 1989
- Raffaele Calabro: 6 January 1989
- Francisco José Arnáiz Zarandona: 6 January 1989
- Ramón Benito de La Rosa y Carpio: 6 January 1989
- Cipriano Calderón Polo: 6 January 1989
- Alvaro Leonel Ramazzini Imeri: 6 January 1989
- Andrea Maria Erba: 6 January 1989
- Józef Kowalczyk: 6 January 1989
- Edmond Farhat: 6 January 1989
- Janusz Bolonek: 6 January 1989
- Tadeusz Kondrusiewicz: 6 January 1989
- Giovanni Tonucci: 6 January 1990
- Ignazio Bedini: 6 January 1990
- Mario Milano: 6 January 1990
- Giovanni Ceirano: 6 January 1990
- Oscar Rizzato: 6 January 1990
- Antonio Ignacio Velasco Garcia: 6 January 1990
- Paul Runangaza Ruzoka: 6 January 1990
- Marian Błażej Kruszyłowicz: 6 January 1990
- Pierre François Marie Joseph Duprey: 6 January 1990
- Domenico Umberto D'Ambrosio: 6 January 1990
- Edward Dajczak: 6 January 1990
- Benjamin Almoneda: 6 January 1990
- Francesco Gioia: 5 April 1990
- Edward Nowak: 5 April 1990
- Giacinto Berloco: 5 April 1990
- Erwin Josef Ender: 5 April 1990
- Jean-Louis Tauran: 6 January 1991
- Vinko Puljic: 6 January 1991
- Marcello Costalunga: 6 January 1991
- Osvaldo Padilla: 6 January 1991
- Francisco Javier Errázuriz Ossa: 6 January 1991
- Bruno Pius Ngonyani: 6 January 1991
- Francis Emmanuel Ogbonna Okobo: 6 January 1991
- Andrea Gemma: 6 January 1991
- Joseph Habib Hitti: 6 January 1991
- Jacinto Guerrero Torres: 6 January 1991
- Álvaro del Portillo: 6 January 1991
- Julián Herranz Casado: 6 January 1991
- Bruno Bertagna: 6 January 1991
- Ernesto Maria Fiore: 6 January 1992
- Rino Passigato: 6 January 1992
- Juan Matogo Oyana: 6 January 1992
- Gastone Simoni: 6 January 1992
- Iñaki Mallona Txertudi: 6 January 1992
- Philippe Nkiere Keana: 6 January 1992
- Benjamin de Jesus: 6 January 1992
- John Joseph Glynn: 6 January 1992
- Petar Šolić: 6 January 1992
- Michael Louis Fitzgerald: 6 January 1992
- Henri Salina: 6 January 1992
- Crescenzio Sepe: 26 April 1992
- Antonio Franco: 26 April 1992
- Carlo Maria Viganò: 26 April 1992
- Luigi Travaglino: 26 April 1992
- Tadeusz Rakoczy: 26 April 1992
- Tadeusz Pieronek: 26 April 1992
- Enzo Dieci: 26 April 1992
- Nerses Der Nersessian: 17 November 1992
- Diego Causero: 6 January 1993
- Charles G. Palmer-Buckle: 6 January 1993
- Elio Sgreccia: 6 January 1993
- Henryk Tomasik: 6 January 1993
- Henry Joseph Mansell: 6 January 1993
- Jan Kopiec: 6 January 1993
- Alojz Uran: 6 January 1993
- Luigi Sposito: 6 January 1993
- Norbert Klemens Strotmann Hoppe: 6 January 1993
- Elmo Noel Joseph Perera: 6 January 1993
- Csaba Ternyák: 6 January 1993
- Franco Illia: 25 April 1993
- Rrok Kola Mirdita: 25 April 1993
- Robert Ashta: 25 April 1993
- Zef Simoni: 25 April 1993
- Peter Paul Prabhu: 6 January 1994
- Peter Stephan Zurbriggen: 6 January 1994
- Jean-Paul Gobel: 6 January 1994
- Julien Mawule Kouto: 6 January 1994
- Edward James Slattery: 6 January 1994
- Uriah Adolphus Ashley Maclean: 6 January 1994
- Emiliano Antonio Cisneros Martínez: 6 January 1994
- Américo do Couto Oliveira: 6 January 1994
- Christo Proykov: 6 January 1994
- Ramon Arguelles: 6 January 1994
- Ricardo Valenzuela Rios: 6 January 1994
- Paolo Gillet: 6 January 1994
- Antoni Józef Długosz: 6 January 1994
- Bruno Musarò: 6 January 1995
- Petko Jordanov Christov: 6 January 1995
- Antonio Napoletano: 6 January 1995
- Zacharias Cenita Jimenez: 6 January 1995
- Raymond Leo Burke: 6 January 1995
- Pierfranco Pastore: 6 January 1995
- Stanislav Shyrokoradiuk: 6 January 1995
- Paweł Cieślik: 6 January 1995
- Stefan Regmunt: 6 January 1995
- José Paulino Ríos Reynoso: 6 January 1996
- Riccardo Fontana: 6 January 1996
- Claudio Maria Celli: 6 January 1996
- Jaime Vieira Rocha: 6 January 1996
- Kurt Koch: 6 January 1996
- Ārvaldis Andrejs Brumanis: 6 January 1996
- Antons Juts: 6 January 1996
- Francisco Pérez González: 6 January 1996
- Richard Anthony Burke: 6 January 1996
- Marko Sopi: 6 January 1996
- Rafael Ramón Conde Alfonzo: 6 January 1996
- Riccardo Ruotolo: 6 January 1996
- Antal Majnek: 6 January 1996
- Stanisław Ryłko: 6 January 1996
- Luigi Pezzuto: 6 January 1997
- Paolo Sardi: 6 January 1997
- Varkey Vithayathil: 6 January 1997
- Delio Lucarelli: 6 January 1997
- Ignace Baguibassa Sambar-Talkena: 6 January 1997
- Luciano Pacomio: 6 January 1997
- Angelo Massafra: 6 January 1997
- Florentin Crihălmeanu: 6 January 1997
- Jean-Claude Périsset: 6 January 1997
- Piotr Libera: 6 January 1997
- Basílio do Nascimento: 6 January 1997
- Hil Kabashi: 6 January 1997
- Mario Francesco Pompedda: 6 January 1998
- Marco Dino Brogi: 6 January 1998
- Peter Kwaku Atuahene: 6 January 1998
- Filippo Strofaldi: 6 January 1998
- Wiktor Paweł Skworc: 6 January 1998
- Franco Dalla Valle: 6 January 1998
- Angelito Lampon: 6 January 1998
- Tomislav Koljatic Maroevic: 6 January 1998
- Francesco Saverio Salerno: 6 January 1998
- James Michael Harvey: 19 March 1998
- Stanisław Dziwisz: 19 March 1998
- Piero Marini: 19 March 1998
- Alessandro D'Errico: 6 January 1999
- Salvatore Pennacchio: 6 January 1999
- Alain Paul Lebeaupin: 6 January 1999
- Cesare Mazzolari: 6 January 1999
- Pierre Trần Ðình Tứ: 6 January 1999
- Rafael Cob García: 6 January 1999
- Mathew Moolakkatt: 6 January 1999
- Diarmuid Martin: 6 January 1999
- José Luis Redrado Marchite: 6 January 1999
- Józef Wesołowski: 6 January 2000
- Giacomo Guido Ottonello: 6 January 2000
- George Panikulam: 6 January 2000
- Alberto Bottari de Castello: 6 January 2000
- Ivo Baldi Gaburri: 6 January 2000
- Gabriel Mbilingi: 6 January 2000
- David Laurin Ricken: 6 January 2000
- Anton Coșa: 6 January 2000
- András Veres: 6 January 2000
- Péter Erdő: 6 January 2000
- Giuseppe Pasotto: 6 January 2000
- Franco Croci: 6 January 2000
- Fernando Filoni: 19 March 2001
- Henryk Józef Nowacki: 19 March 2001
- Timothy Broglio: 19 March 2001
- Domenico Sorrentino: 19 March 2001
- Tomasz Peta: 19 March 2001
- Marcelo Sánchez Sorondo: 19 March 2001
- Marc Ouellet: 19 March 2001
- Giampaolo Crepaldi: 19 March 2001
- Đura Džudžar: 19 March 2001
- Giuseppe Pinto: 6 January 2002
- Claudio Gugerotti: 6 January 2002
- Adolfo Tito Yllana: 6 January 2002
- Giovanni d'Aniello: 6 January 2002
- Daniel Mizonzo: 6 January 2002
- Louis Portella Mbuyu: 6 January 2002
- Marcel Utembi Tapa: 6 January 2002
- Franco Agostinelli: 6 January 2002
- Amândio José Tomás: 6 January 2002
- Vittorio Lanzani: 6 January 2002
- Paul Tschang In-Nam: 6 January 2003
- Celestino Migliore: 6 January 2003
- Pierre Nguyên Van Tot: 6 January 2003
- Pedro López Quintana: 6 January 2003
- Angelo Amato: 6 January 2003
- Calogero La Piana: 6 January 2003
- René-Marie Ehouzou: 6 January 2003
- Ján Babjak: 6 January 2003
- Andraos Abouna: 6 January 2003
- Milan Šašik: 6 January 2003
- Giuseppe Nazzaro: 6 January 2003
- Brian Farrell: 6 January 2003

Pope John Paul II (Note: Latin: Ioannes Paulus II; Italian: Giovanni Paolo II; Polish: Jan Paweł II) (born Karol Józef Wojtyła; (Note: Polish pronunciation: [ˈkarɔl ˈjuzɛv‿vɔjˈtɨwa]; in isolation, Józef is pronounced [ˈjuzɛf].) 18 May 1920 – 2 April 2005) was the head of the Catholic Church and sovereign of Vatican City from 16 October 1978 until his death in 2005. He was the first non-Italian pope since Adrian VI in the 16th century, as well as the third longest-serving pope in history, after St. Peter and Pius IX. (Note: John Paul II is also the only pope since 1523 to have no documented Italian ancestry, as his successors Benedict XVI, Francis, and Leo XIV all have Italian ancestors, though none have been Italian citizens.) In addition to this, he was an important philosopher and theologian of the 20th century.

In his youth, Wojtyła worked occasionally as a stage actor. He graduated from an all-boys high school in Wadowice, Poland in 1938, shortly before World War II broke out. During the war, to avoid being kidnapped and sent to a German forced labour camp, he signed up for work in harsh conditions in a quarry. Wojtyła eventually took up acting and developed a love for the profession and participated at a local theatre. The linguistically skilled Wojtyła wanted to study Polish in university. During his studies, he was encouraged by a conversation with Adam Stefan Sapieha to study theology and become a priest. Eventually, Wojtyła rose to the position of Archbishop of Kraków and then to cardinal, both positions held by his mentor. Wojtyła was elected pope on the third day of the October 1978 conclave, becoming one of the youngest popes in more than a century. The conclave was called after the death of John Paul I, who served only 33 days as pope. Wojtyła adopted the name of his predecessor in tribute to him.

Pope John Paul II attempted to improve the Catholic Church's relations with Judaism, Islam, and the Eastern Orthodox Church in the spirit of ecumenism, holding atheism as the greatest threat. He maintained the Church's previous positions on such matters as abortion, artificial contraception, the ordination of women, and a celibate clergy, and although he supported the reforms of the Second Vatican Council, he was seen as generally conventional in their interpretation. He put emphasis on family and identity, while questioning consumerism, hedonism and the pursuit of wealth. He was one of the most-travelled world leaders in history, visiting 129 countries during his pontificate. As part of his special emphasis on the universal call to holiness, Pope John Paul II beatified 1,344 people, and canonised 483 saints, more than the combined tally of his predecessors during the preceding five centuries. By the time of his death, he had named most of the College of Cardinals, consecrated or co-consecrated many of the world's bishops, and ordained many priests. Pope John Paul II died on 2 April 2005, and was succeeded by Pope Benedict XVI.

Pope John Paul II has been credited with fighting against dictatorships and with helping to end communist rule in his native Poland and the rest of Europe. Under John Paul II, the Catholic Church greatly expanded its influence in Africa and Latin America and retained its influence in Europe and the rest of the world. He was proclaimed venerable by Pope Benedict XVI on 19 December 2009, and on 1 May 2011 (Divine Mercy Sunday) he was beatified. On 27 April 2014, Pope John Paul II was canonised by Pope Francis, alongside Pope John XXIII. He has been criticised for allegedly not acting against or having been insufficiently harsh against the sexual abuse of children by priests, both as archbishop in the Polish People's Republic and during his papacy. After his canonisation, he has been referred to by some Catholics as "Pope Saint John Paul the Great", though that title is not official.

Under Pope John Paul II, two of the most important documents of the contemporary Catholic Church were drafted and promulgated: the 1983 Code of Canon Law, which revised and updated the 1917 Code of Canon Law, and the Catechism of the Catholic Church, the first universal catechism to be issued since the Roman Catechism.

== Early life ==
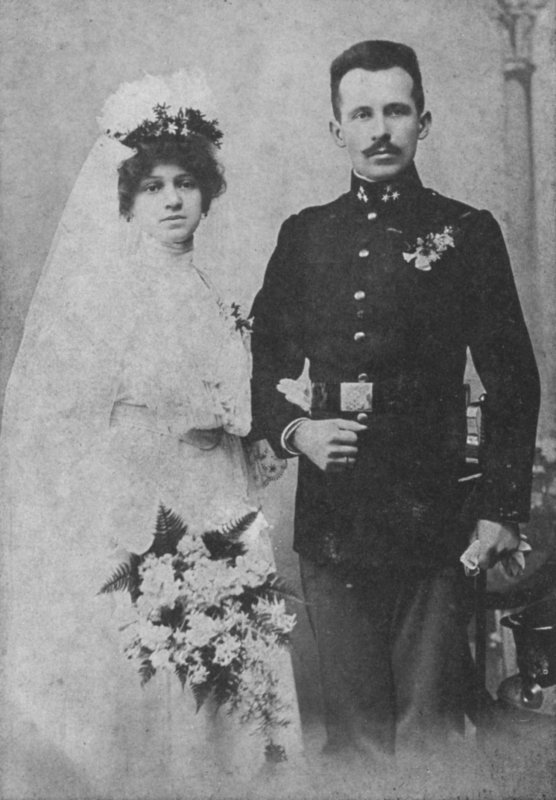
The wedding portrait of John Paul II's parents, Emilia and Karol Wojtyła Sr.

Karol Józef Wojtyła was born in the Polish town of Wadowice. He was the youngest of three children born to Karol Wojtyła (1879–1941), an ethnic Pole, and Emilia Kaczorowska (1884–1929), who was of distant Lithuanian heritage. Emilia, who was a schoolteacher, died from a heart attack and kidney failure in 1929 when Wojtyła was eight years old. His elder sister Olga had died before his birth, but he was close to his brother Edmund, nicknamed Mundek, who was 13 years his senior. Edmund's work as a physician eventually led to his death from scarlet fever, a loss that affected Wojtyła deeply.

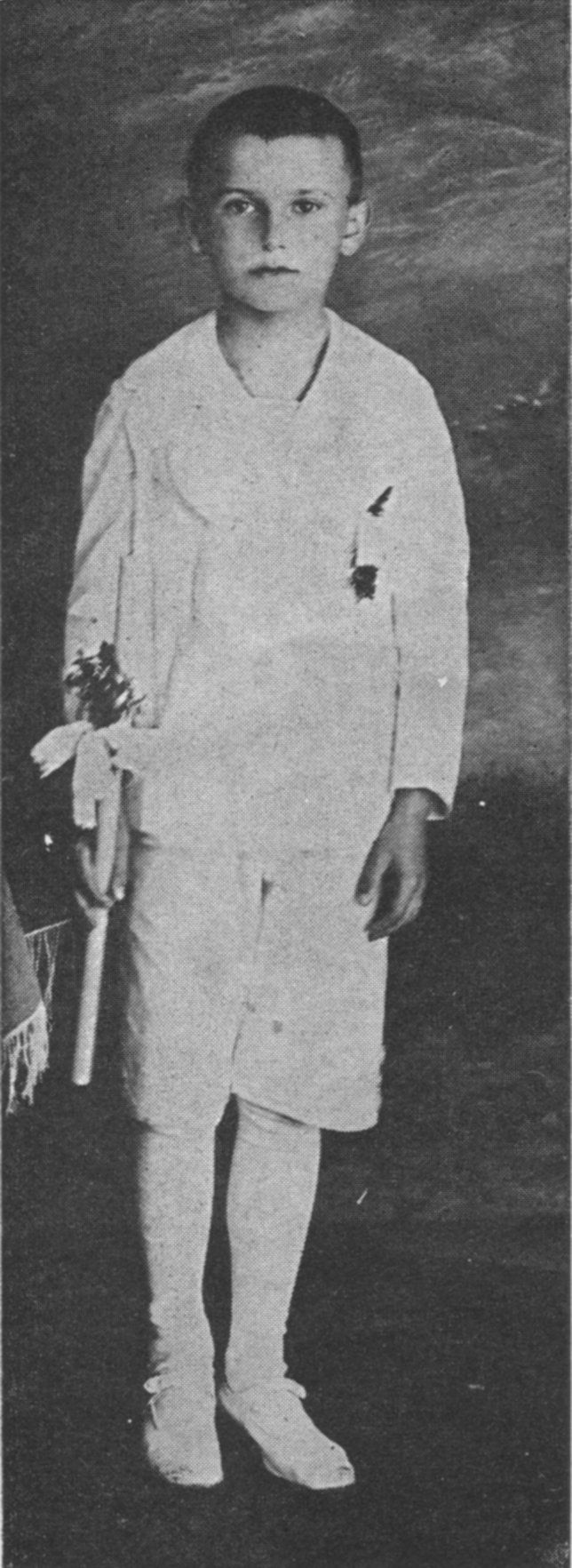
Wojtyła on the day of his first communion

Wojtyła was baptized a month after his birth, made his First Communion at the age of 9, and was confirmed at the age of 18. As a boy, Wojtyła was athletic, often playing association football as goalkeeper. During his childhood, Wojtyła had contact with the large Jewish community of Wadowice. School football games were often organised between teams of Jews and Catholics, and Wojtyła often played on the Jewish side. In 2005, he recalled: "I remember that at least a third of my classmates at elementary school in Wadowice were Jews. At secondary school there were fewer. With some I was on very friendly terms. And what struck me about some of them was their Polish patriotism." It was around this time that the young Karol had his first serious relationship with a girl. He became close to a girl called Ginka Beer, described as "a Jewish beauty, with stupendous eyes and jet black hair, slender, a superb actress."

In mid-1938, Wojtyła and his father left Wadowice and moved to Kraków, where he enrolled at the Jagiellonian University. While studying such topics as philology and various languages, he worked as a volunteer librarian and though required to participate in compulsory military training in the Academic Legion, he refused to fire a weapon. He performed with various theatrical groups and worked as a playwright. During this time, his talent for language blossomed, and he learned as many as 15 languages – Polish, Latin, Italian, English, Spanish, Portuguese, French, German, Luxembourgish, Dutch, Ukrainian, Serbo-Croatian, Czech, Slovak, and Esperanto, nine of which he used extensively as pope.

In 1939, after invading Poland, Nazi Germany's occupation forces closed the university. Able-bodied males were required to work, so from 1940 to 1944 Wojtyła variously worked as a messenger for a restaurant, a manual labourer in a limestone quarry and for the Solvay chemical factory, to avoid deportation to Germany. In February 1940, he met Jan Tyranowski, who introduced him to the Carmelite spirituality and the "Living Rosary" youth groups. In that same year he had two major accidents, suffering a fractured skull after being struck by a tram and sustaining injuries which left him with one shoulder higher than the other and a permanent stoop after being hit by a lorry in the quarry. His father, a former Austro-Hungarian non-commissioned officer and later officer in the Polish Army, died of a heart attack in 1941, leaving the young adult Wojtyła an orphan and the immediate family's only surviving member. Reflecting on these times of his life, nearly 40 years later he said: "I was not at my mother's death, I was not at my brother's death, I was not at my father's death. At twenty, I had already lost all the people I loved."

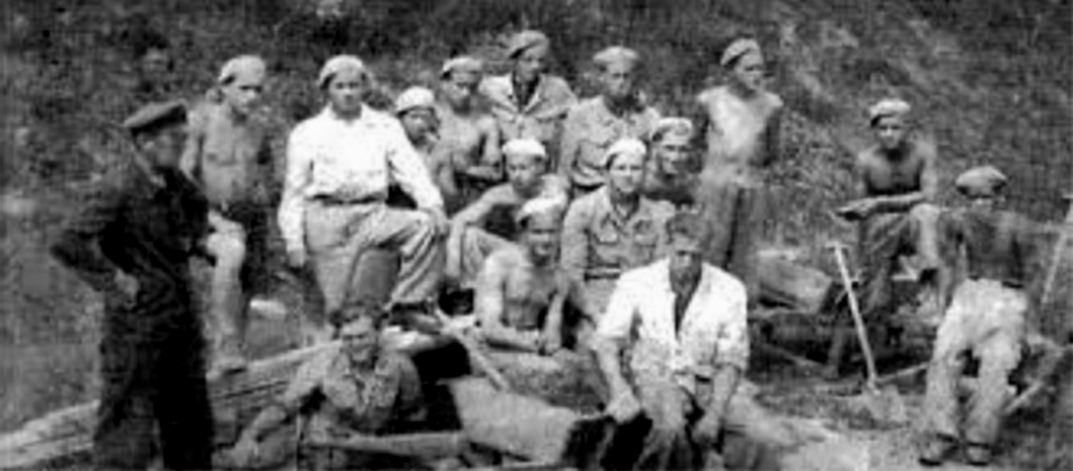
Wojtyła (second from right) in a Baudienst forced labour work crew during the occupation of Poland (1939–1945), c. 1941

After his father's death, he started thinking seriously about the priesthood. In October 1942, while World War II continued, he knocked on the door of the Bishop's Palace, and asked to study for the priesthood. Soon after, he began courses in the clandestine underground seminary run by the Archbishop of Kraków, the future Cardinal Adam Stefan Sapieha. On 29 February 1944, Wojtyła was hit by a German truck. German Wehrmacht officers tended to him and sent him to a hospital. He spent two weeks there recovering from a severe concussion and a shoulder injury. It seemed to him that this accident and his survival was a confirmation of his vocation. On 6 August 1944, a day known as "Black Sunday", the Gestapo rounded up young men in Kraków to curtail the uprising there, similar to the recent uprising in Warsaw. Wojtyła escaped by hiding in the basement of his uncle's house at 10 Tyniecka Street, while the German troops searched above. More than 8,000 men and boys were taken that day, while Wojtyła escaped to the Archbishop's residence, where he remained until after the Germans had left.

On the night of 17 January 1945, the Germans fled the city, and the students reclaimed the ruined seminary. Wojtyła and another seminarian volunteered for the task of clearing away piles of frozen excrement from the toilets. Wojtyła also helped a 14-year-old Jewish refugee girl named Edith Zierer, who had escaped from a Nazi labour camp in Częstochowa. Edith had collapsed on a railway platform, so Wojtyła carried her to a train and stayed with her throughout the journey to Kraków. She later credited Wojtyła with saving her life that day. B'nai B'rith and other authorities have said that Wojtyła helped protect many other Polish Jews from the Nazis. During the Nazi occupation of Poland, a Jewish family sent their son, Stanley Berger, to be hidden by a Gentile Polish family. Berger's biological Jewish parents were killed in the Holocaust, and after the war Berger's new Christian parents asked Karol Wojtyła to baptise the boy. Wojtyła refused, saying that the child should be raised in the Jewish faith of his birth parents and nation, not as a Catholic. He did everything he could to ensure that Berger leave Poland to be raised by his Jewish relatives in the United States. In April 2005, shortly after John Paul II's death, the Israeli government created a commission to honour the legacy of John Paul II. One of the honorifics proposed by a head of Italy's Jewish community, Emmanuele Pacifici was the medal of the Righteous Among the Nations. In Wojtyła's last book, Memory and Identity, he described the 12 years of the Nazi régime as "bestiality", quoting from the Polish theologian and philosopher Konstanty Michalski.

== Priesthood ==
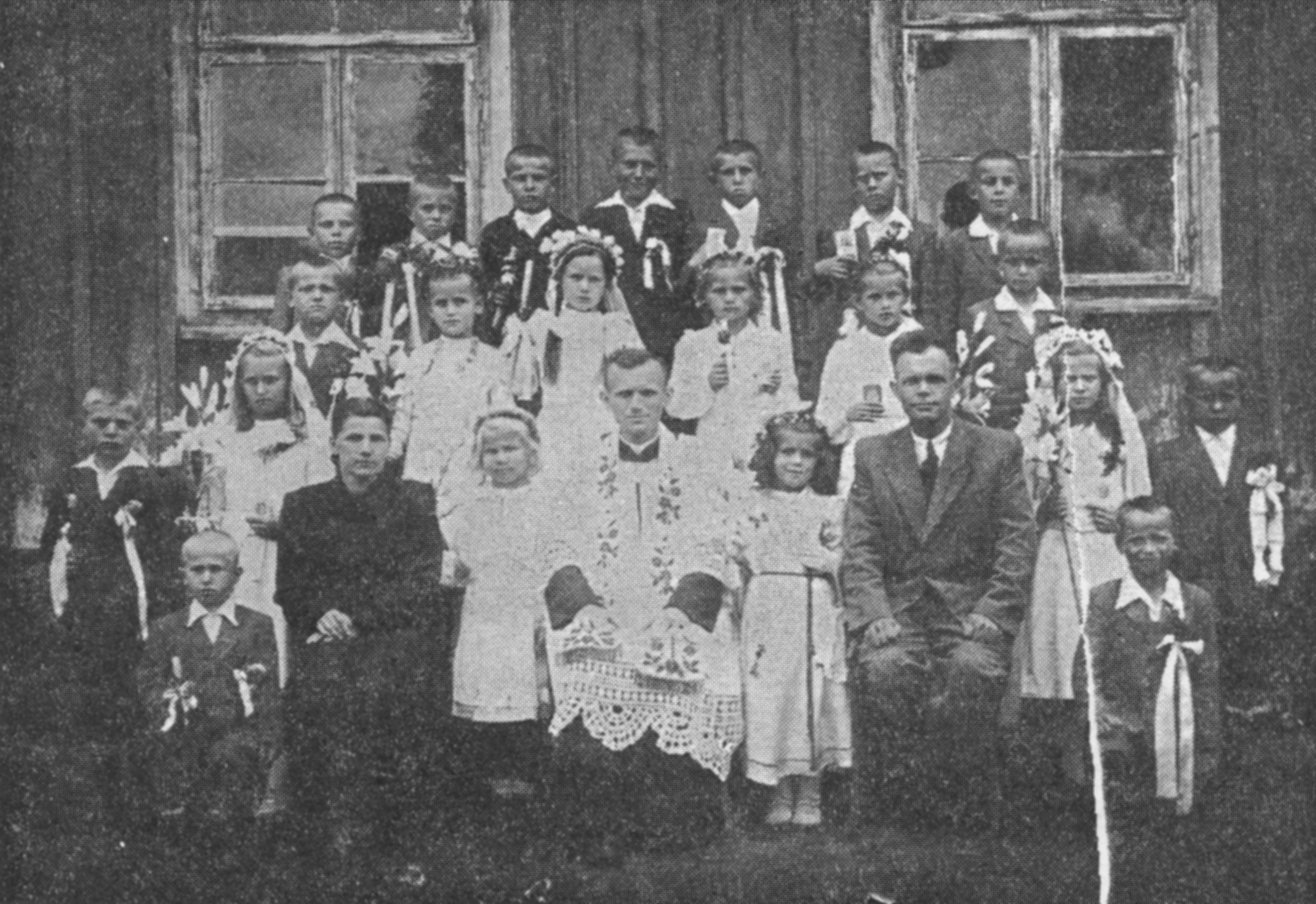
Wojtyła (centre) in 1949

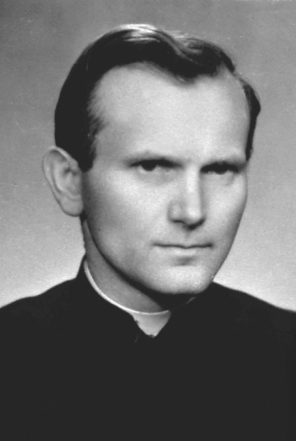
Wojtyła in 1958

After finishing his studies at the seminary in Kraków, Wojtyła was ordained as a priest on All Saints' Day, 1 November 1946, by the Archbishop of Kraków, Cardinal Adam Stefan Sapieha. Sapieha sent Wojtyła to Rome's Pontifical International Athenaeum Angelicum, the future Pontifical University of Saint Thomas Aquinas, to study under the French Dominican friar Reginald Garrigou-Lagrange beginning on 26 November 1946. He resided in the Belgian Pontifical College during this time, under rectorship of Maximilien de Furstenberg. Wojtyła earned a licence in July 1947, passed his doctoral exam on 14 June 1948, and successfully defended his doctoral thesis titled Doctrina de fide apud S. Ioannem a Cruce (The Doctrine of Faith in St. John of the Cross) in philosophy on 19 June 1948. The Angelicum preserves the original copy of Wojtyła's typewritten thesis. Among other courses at the Angelicum, Wojtyła studied Hebrew with the Dutch Dominican Peter G. Duncker, author of the Compendium grammaticae linguae hebraicae biblicae.

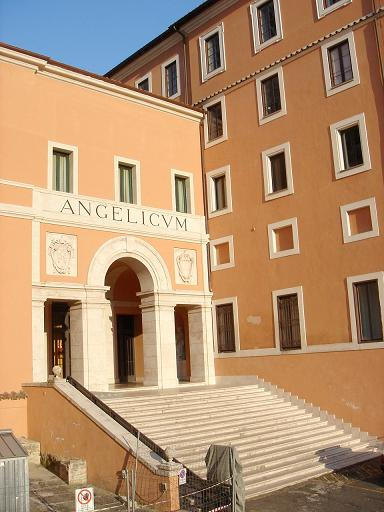
The Pontifical International Athenaeum Angelicum in Rome, Italy

According to Wojtyła's fellow student, the future Austrian cardinal Alfons Stickler, in 1947 during his sojourn at the Angelicum, Wojtyła visited Padre Pio, who heard his confession and told him that one day he would ascend to "the highest post in the Church". Stickler added that Wojtyła believed that the prophecy was fulfilled when he became a cardinal.

Wojtyła returned to Poland in the summer of 1948 for his first pastoral assignment in the village of Niegowić, 24 kilometres (15 miles) from Kraków, at the Church of the Assumption. He arrived at Niegowić at harvest time, where his first action was to kneel and kiss the ground. He repeated this gesture, which he adopted from John Vianney, throughout his papacy.

In March 1949, Wojtyła was transferred to the parish of Saint Florian in Kraków. He taught ethics at Jagiellonian University and subsequently at the Catholic University of Lublin. While teaching, he gathered a group of about 20 young people, who began to call themselves Rodzinka, the "little family". They met for prayer, philosophical discussion, and to help the blind and the sick. The group eventually grew to approximately 200 participants, and their activities expanded to include annual skiing and kayaking trips.

In 1953, Wojtyła's habilitation thesis was accepted by the Faculty of Theology at the Jagiellonian University. In 1954, he earned a Doctorate in Sacred Theology, writing a dissertation titled "Reevaluation of the possibility of founding a Catholic ethic on the ethical system of Max Scheler" (Polish: Ocena możliwości zbudowania etyki chrześcijańskiej przy założeniach systemu Maksa Schelera). Scheler was a German philosopher who founded a broad philosophical movement that emphasised the study of conscious experience. The Polish Communist authorities abolished the Faculty of Theology at the Jagiellonian University, thereby preventing him from receiving the degree until 1957. Wojtyła developed a theological approach, called phenomenological Thomism, that combined traditional Catholic Thomism with the ideas of personalism, a philosophical approach deriving from phenomenology, which was popular among Catholic intellectuals in Kraków during Wojtyła's intellectual development. He translated Scheler's Formalism and the Ethics of Substantive Values. In 1961, he coined "Thomistic Personalism" to describe Aquinas's philosophy.

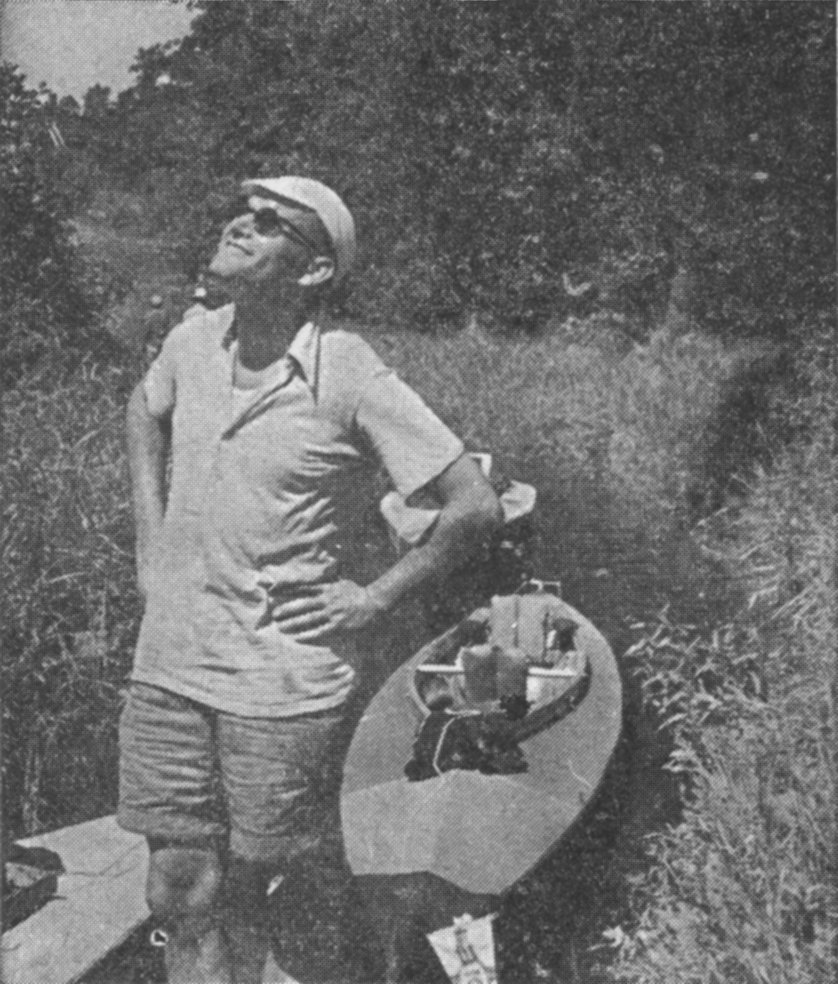
Wojtyła pictured during a kayaking trip to the countryside with a group of students, c. 1960

During this period, Wojtyła wrote a series of articles in Kraków's Catholic newspaper, Tygodnik Powszechny (Universal Weekly), dealing with contemporary church issues. He focused on creating original literary work during his first dozen years as a priest. War, life in the Polish People's Republic, and his pastoral responsibilities all fed his poetry and plays. Wojtyła published his work under two pseudonyms, Andrzej Jawień and Stanisław Andrzej Gruda, to distinguish his literary from his religious writings (issued under his own name), and also so that his literary works would be considered on their own merits. In 1960, Wojtyła published the influential theological book Love and Responsibility, a defence of traditional church teachings on marriage from a new philosophical standpoint.

The aforementioned students regularly joined Wojtyła for hiking, skiing, bicycling, camping and kayaking, accompanied by prayer, outdoor Masses, and theological discussions. In Stalinist-era Poland, it was not permitted for priests to travel with groups of students. Wojtyła asked his younger companions to call him "Wujek" (Polish for "Uncle") to prevent outsiders from deducing he was a priest. The nickname gained popularity among his followers. In 1958, when Wojtyła was named auxiliary bishop of Kraków, his acquaintances expressed concern that this would cause him to change. Wojtyła responded to his friends, "Wujek will remain Wujek", and he continued to live a simple life, shunning the trappings that came with his position as bishop. This beloved nickname stayed with Wojtyła for his entire life and continues to be affectionately used, particularly by the Polish people.

== Episcopate and cardinalate ==
=== Call to the episcopate ===
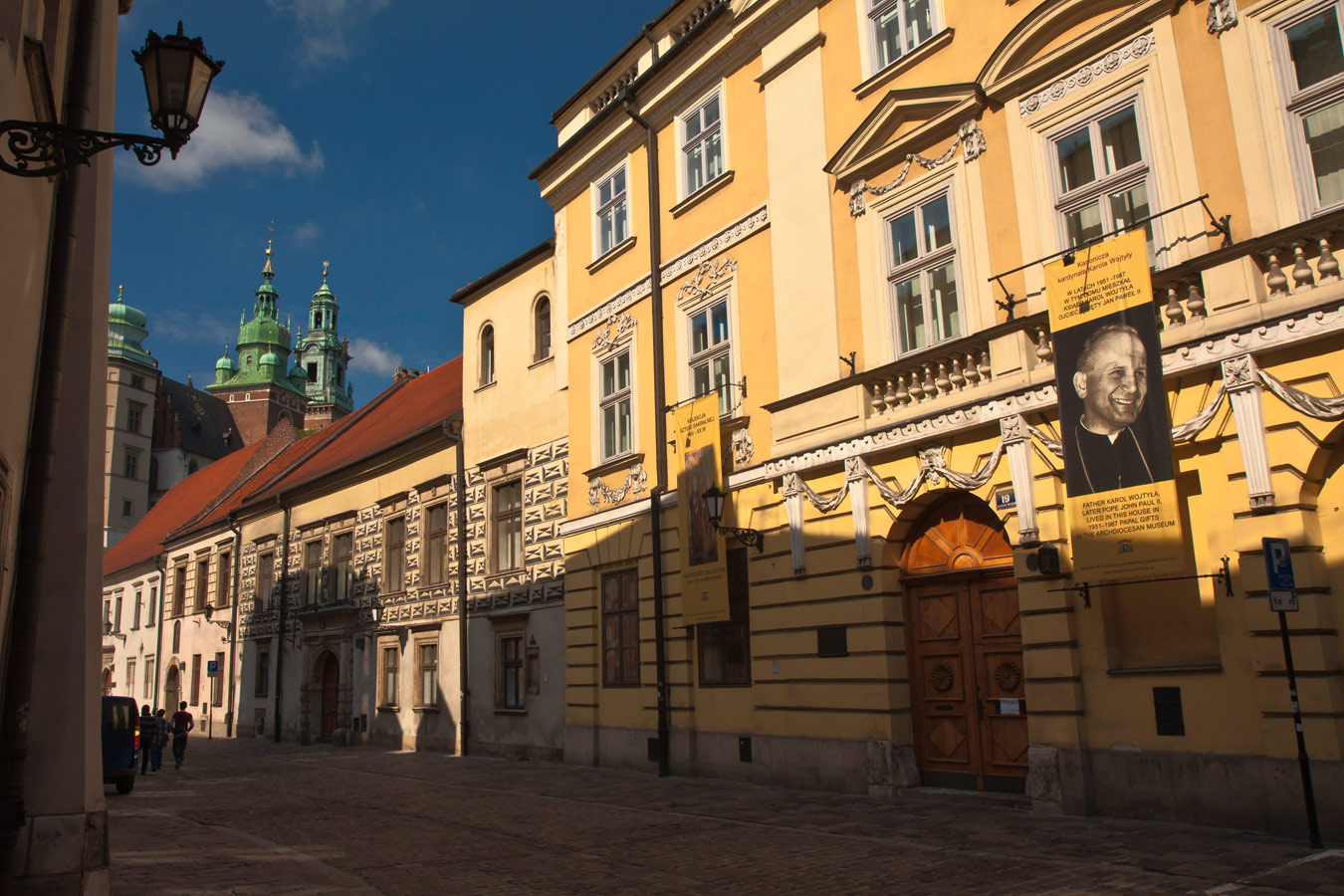
19 Kanonicza Street in Kraków, Poland, where John Paul II lived as a priest and bishop (now an Archdiocese Museum)

On 4 July 1958, while Wojtyła was on a kayaking holiday in the lakes region of northern Poland, Pope Pius XII appointed him as an auxiliary bishop of Kraków. He was consequently summoned to Warsaw to meet the Primate of Poland, Cardinal Stefan Wyszyński, who informed him of his appointment. Wojtyła accepted the appointment as auxiliary bishop to Kraków's Archbishop Eugeniusz Baziak, and he received episcopal consecration (as titular bishop of Ombi) on 28 September 1958, with Baziak as the principal consecrator and as co-consecrators Bishop Bolesław Kominek (titular bishop of Sophene), auxiliary of the Catholic Archdiocese of Wrocław, and Franciszek Jop, Auxiliary Bishop of Sandomierz (Titular Bishop of Daulia). Kominek was to become Cardinal Archbishop of Wrocław and Jop was later Auxiliary Bishop of Wrocław and then Bishop of Opole. At the age of 38, Wojtyła became the youngest bishop in Poland.

In 1959, Wojtyła began an annual tradition of saying a Midnight Mass on Christmas Day in an open field at Nowa Huta, the so-called model workers' town outside Kraków that was without a church building. Baziak died in June 1962 and on 16 July, Wojtyła was selected as Vicar Capitular (temporary administrator) of the Archdiocese until an archbishop could be appointed.

=== Participation in Vatican II and subsequent events ===
Wojtyła in pontifical vestments as Archbishop of Kraków, wearing the superhumerale, a vestment only granted to three other bishops in the Latin Church

From October 1962, Wojtyła took part in the Second Vatican Council (1962–1965), where he made contributions to two of its most historic and influential products, the Decree on Religious Freedom (in Latin, Dignitatis humanae) and the Pastoral Constitution on the Church in the Modern World (Gaudium et spes). Wojtyła and the Polish bishops contributed a draft text to the Council for Gaudium et spes. According to the Jesuit historian John W. O'Malley, the draft text Gaudium et spes that Wojtyła and the Polish delegation sent "had some influence on the version that was sent to the council fathers that summer but was not accepted as the base text". According to John F. Crosby, as pope, John Paul II used the words of Gaudium et spes later to introduce his own views on the nature of the human person in relation to God: man is "the only creature on earth that God has wanted for its own sake", but man "can fully discover his true self only in a sincere giving of himself".

Wojtyła also participated in the assemblies of the Synod of Bishops. On 13 January 1964, Pope Paul VI appointed him Archbishop of Kraków. On 26 June 1967, Paul VI announced Wojtyła's promotion to the College of Cardinals. Wojtyła was named cardinal priest of the titular church of San Cesareo in Palatio.

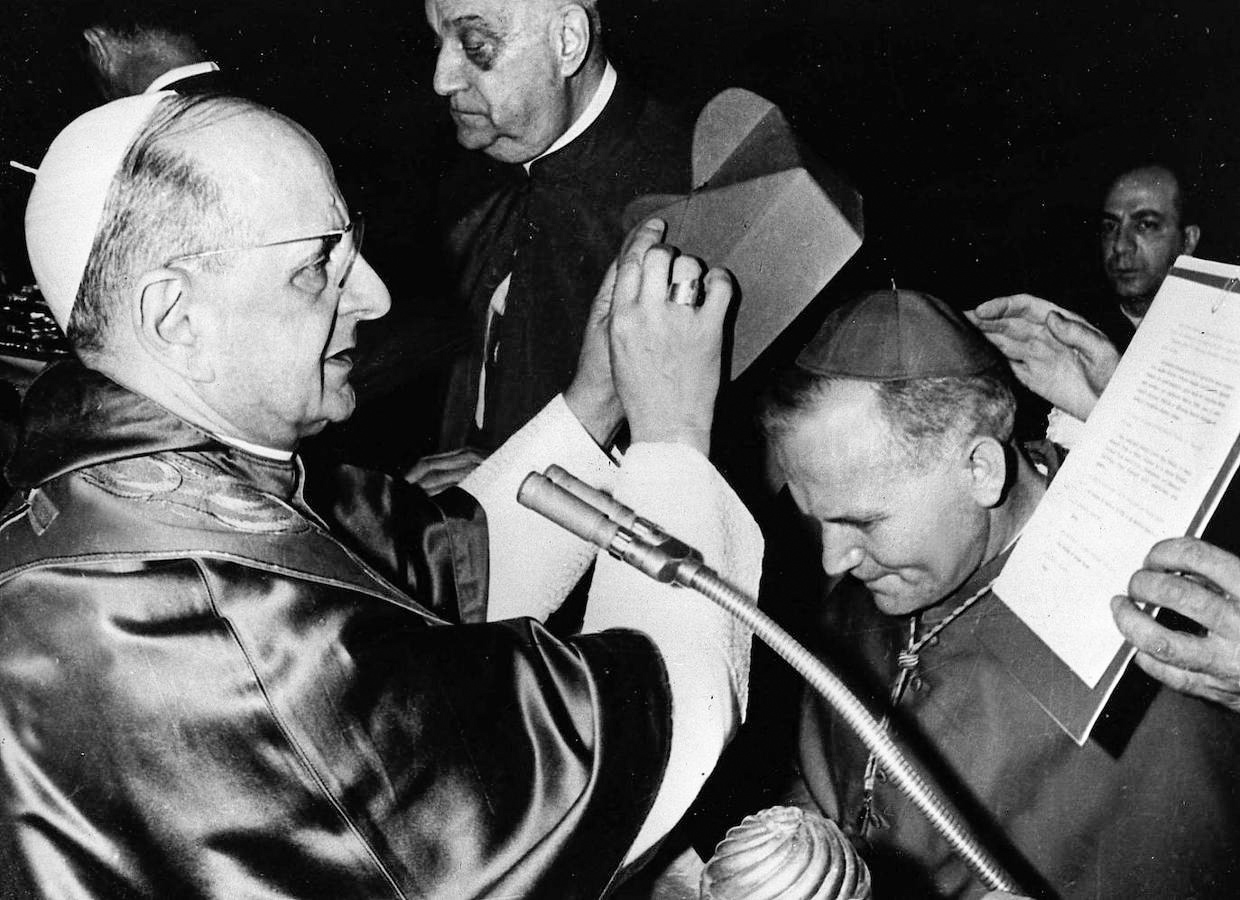
Pope Paul VI imposing the cardinal biretta on Wojtyła in 1967

In 1967, he was instrumental in formulating the encyclical Humanae vitae, which dealt with the same issues that forbid abortion and artificial birth control.

According to a contemporary witness, Wojtyła was against the distribution of a letter around Kraków in 1970, stating that the Polish Episcopate was preparing for the 50th anniversary of the Polish–Soviet War.

In 1973, Wojtyła met philosopher Anna-Teresa Tymieniecka, the wife of Hendrik S. Houthakker, professor of economics at Stanford University and Harvard University, and member of President Richard Nixon's Council of Economic Advisers Tymieniecka collaborated with Wojtyła on a number of projects including an English translation of Wojtyła's book Osoba i czyn (Person and Act). Person and Act, one of John Paul II's foremost literary works, was initially written in Polish. Tymieniecka produced the English-language version. They corresponded over the years, and grew to be good friends. When Wojtyła visited New England in the summer of 1976, Tymieniecka put him up as a guest in her family home. Wojtyła enjoyed his holiday in Pomfret, Vermont, kayaking and enjoying the outdoors, as he had done in his beloved Poland.

During 1974–1975, Wojtyła served Pope Paul VI as consultor to the Pontifical Council for the Laity, as recording secretary for the 1974 synod on evangelism and by participating extensively in the original drafting of the 1975 apostolic exhortation, Evangelii nuntiandi.

== Papacy ==
=== Election ===
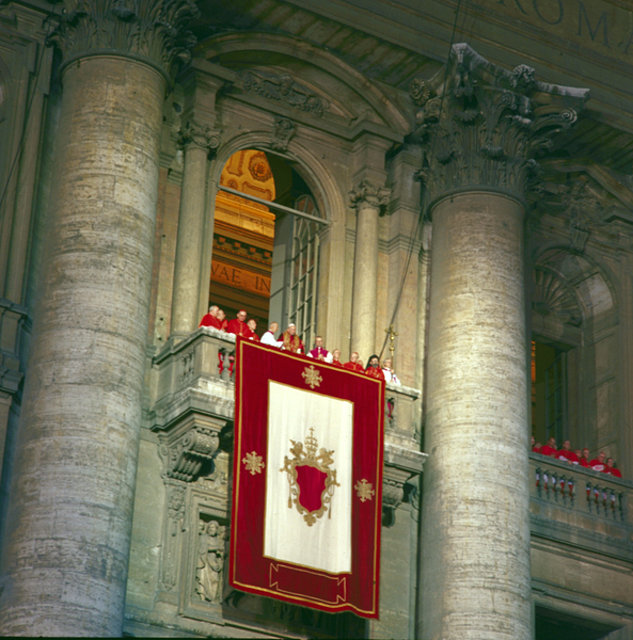
First appearance of Pope John Paul II following his election on 16 October 1978

In August 1978, following the death of Pope Paul VI, Wojtyła voted in the papal conclave, which elected John Paul I. John Paul I died after only 33 days as pope, triggering another conclave.

The second conclave of 1978 started on 14 October, ten days after the funeral. It was split between two strong candidates for the papacy: Cardinal Giuseppe Siri, the conservative Archbishop of Genoa, and Cardinal Giovanni Benelli, the liberal Archbishop of Florence and a close friend of John Paul I.

The coat of arms of John Paul II displaying the Marian Cross with the letter M signifying the Blessed Virgin Mary, the mother of Jesus

Supporters of Benelli were confident that he would be elected, and in early ballots, Benelli came within nine votes of success. However, both men faced sufficient opposition for neither to be likely to prevail. Giovanni Colombo, the Archbishop of Milan, was considered as a compromise candidate among the Italian cardinal-electors, but when he started to receive votes, he announced that, if elected, he would decline to accept the papacy. Cardinal Franz König, Archbishop of Vienna, suggested Wojtyła as another compromise candidate to his fellow electors. Wojtyła won on the eighth ballot on the third day (16 October).

Among those cardinals who rallied behind Wojtyła were supporters of Giuseppe Siri, Stefan Wyszyński, most of the American cardinals (led by John Krol), and other moderate cardinals. He accepted his election with the words: "With obedience in faith to Christ, my Lord, and with trust in the Mother of Christ and the Church, in spite of great difficulties, I accept". The Pope, in tribute to his immediate predecessor, then took the papal name of John Paul II, also in honour of the late Popes Paul VI and John XXIII, and the traditional white smoke informed the crowd gathered in St. Peter's Square that a pope had been chosen. There had been rumours that the new pope wished to be known as Pope Stanislaus in honour of the Polish saint of the name, but was convinced by the cardinals that it was not a Roman name. When the new pontiff appeared on the balcony, he broke tradition by addressing the gathered crowd:

"Dear brothers and sisters, we are saddened at the death of our beloved Pope John Paul I, and so the cardinals have called for a new bishop of Rome. They called him from a faraway land—far and yet always close because of our communion in faith and Christian traditions. I was afraid to accept that responsibility, yet I do so in a spirit of obedience to the Lord and total faithfulness to Mary, our most Holy Mother. I am speaking to you in your—no, our Italian language. If I make a mistake, please corrict [sic] (Note: In his speech, John Paul deliberately chose to mispronounce the Italian word for 'correct'.) me."

Wojtyła became the 264th pope according to the chronological list of popes, and the first non-Italian in 455 years. At only 58 years of age, he was the youngest pope since Pope Pius IX in 1846, who was 54. Like his predecessor, John Paul II dispensed with the traditional papal coronation and instead received ecclesiastical investiture with a simplified papal inauguration on 22 October 1978. During his inauguration, when the cardinals were to kneel before him to take their vows and kiss his ring, he stood up as the Polish prelate, Cardinal Stefan Wyszyński knelt down, stopped him from kissing the ring, and simply embraced him.

=== Pastoral journeys ===
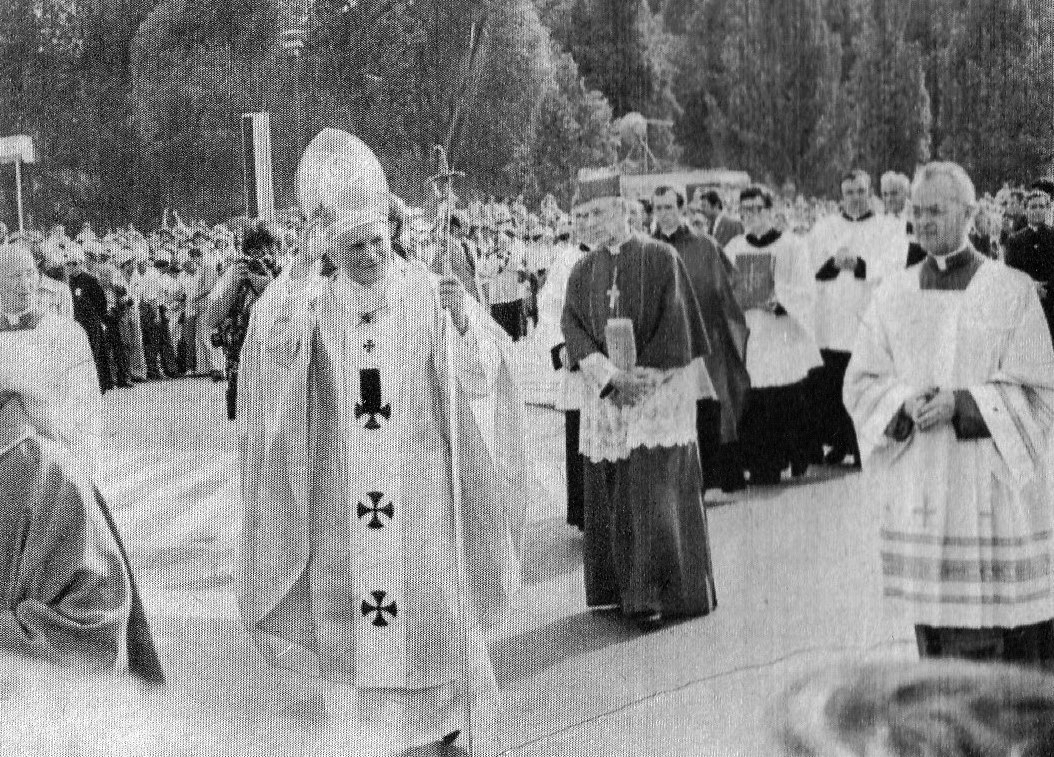
John Paul's first papal trip to Poland in June 1979

During his pontificate, John Paul II made journeys to 129 countries, travelling more than 1,100,000 kilometres (680,000 mi) while doing so. He consistently attracted large crowds, some among the largest ever assembled in human history, such as the Manila World Youth Day 1995, which gathered up to four million people, the largest papal gathering ever, according to the Vatican. John Paul II's earliest official visits were to the Dominican Republic and Mexico in January 1979. While some of his journeys (such as to the United States and the Holy Land) were to places previously visited by Pope Paul VI, John Paul II became the first pope to visit the White House in October 1979, where he was greeted warmly by President Jimmy Carter. He was the first pope ever to visit several countries in one year, starting in 1979 with Mexico and Ireland. He was the first reigning pope to travel to the United Kingdom, in 1982, where he met Queen Elizabeth II, the Supreme Governor of the Church of England. While in Britain he also visited Canterbury Cathedral and knelt in prayer with Robert Runcie, the Archbishop of Canterbury, at the spot where Thomas Becket had been killed, as well as holding several large-scale open air Masses, including one at Wembley Stadium, which was attended by some 80,000 people.

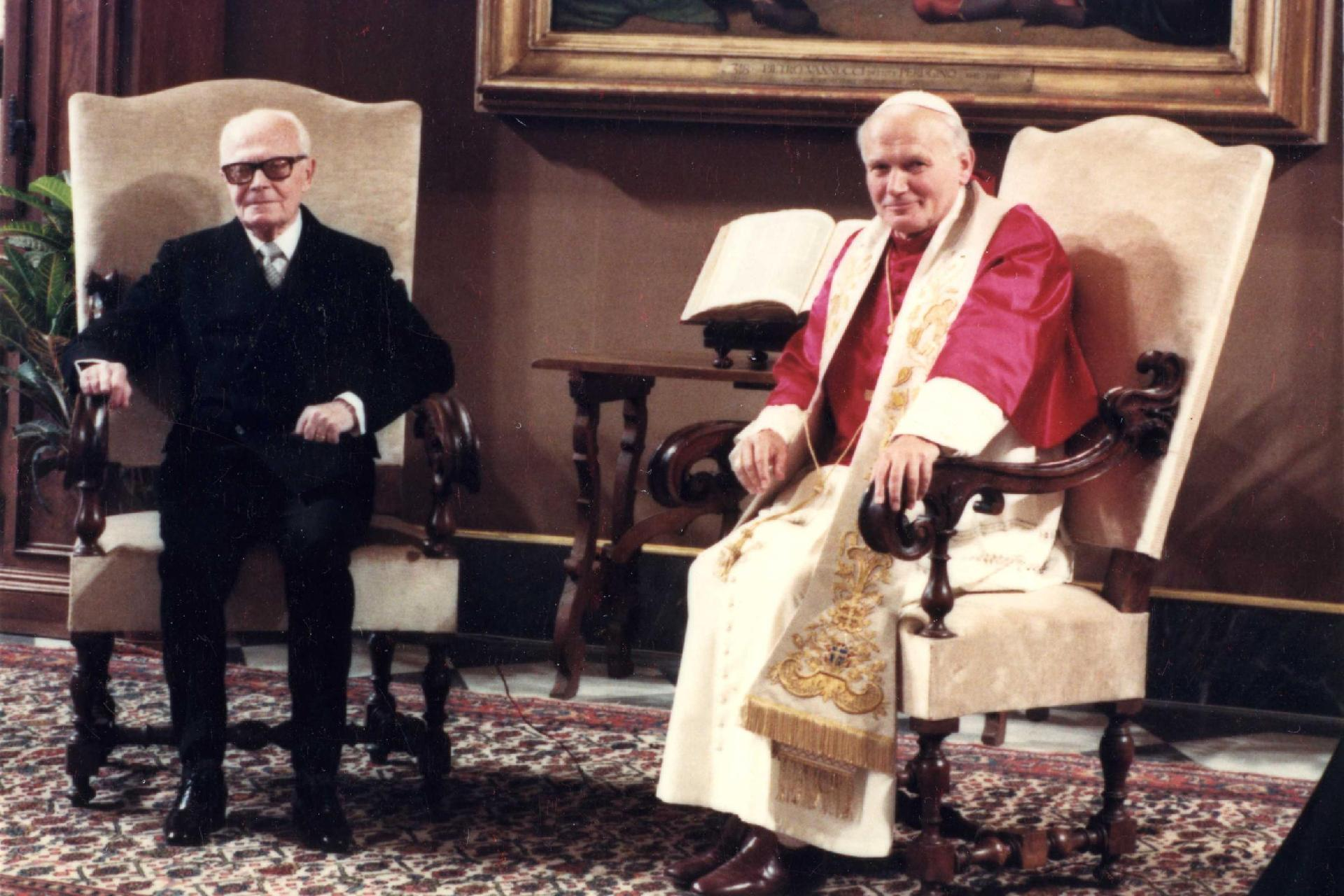
John Paul II with Sandro Pertini, President of Italy, in 1984

He travelled to Haiti in 1983, where he spoke in Creole to thousands of impoverished Catholics gathered to greet him at the airport. His message, "things must change in Haiti", referring to the disparity between the wealthy and the poor, was met with thunderous applause. In 2000, he was the first modern pope to visit Egypt, where he met the Coptic pope, Pope Shenouda III, and the Greek Orthodox Patriarch of Alexandria. He was the first Catholic pope to visit and pray in an Islamic mosque, in Damascus, Syria, in 2001. He visited the Umayyad Mosque, a former Christian church where John the Baptist is believed to be interred, where he made a speech calling for Muslims, Christians and Jews to live together.

On 15 January 1995, during the X World Youth Day, he offered Mass to an estimated crowd of between five and seven million in Luneta Park, Manila, Philippines, which was considered to be the largest single gathering in Christian history. In March 2000, while visiting Jerusalem, John Paul became the first pope in history to visit and pray at the Western Wall. In September 2001, amid post-11 September concerns, he travelled to Kazakhstan, with an audience largely consisting of Muslims, and to Armenia, to participate in the celebration of 1,700 years of Armenian Christianity as well as honor the victims of the Armenian genocide.

In June 1979, John Paul II travelled to Poland, where ecstatic crowds constantly surrounded him. This first papal trip to Poland and the enthusiastic response to it contributed to the formation of the Solidarity movement in 1980, which later played a major role in the end of socialism in Poland. Leaders of the Polish United Workers' Party intended to use the Pope's visit to show the people that although the Pope was Polish, it did not alter their capacity to govern, oppress, and distribute the goods of society. They also hoped that if the Pope abided by the rules they set, the Polish people would see his example and follow them as well. If the Pope's visit inspired a riot, the Communist leaders of Poland were prepared to crush the uprising and blame the suffering on the Pope.

The Pope won that struggle by transcending politics. His was what Joseph Nye calls 'soft power' — the power of attraction and repulsion. He began with an enormous advantage, and exploited it to the utmost: He headed the one institution that stood for the polar opposite of the Communist way of life that the Polish people hated. He was a Pole, but beyond the regime's reach. By identifying with him, Poles would have the chance to cleanse themselves of the compromises they had to make to live under the regime. And so they came to him by the millions. They listened. He told them to be good, not to compromise themselves, to stick by one another, to be fearless, and that God is the only source of goodness, the only standard of conduct. 'Be not afraid,' he said. Millions shouted in response, 'We want God! We want God! We want God!' The regime cowered. Had the Pope chosen to turn his soft power into the hard variety, the regime might have been drowned in blood. Instead, the Pope simply led the Polish people to desert their rulers by affirming solidarity with one another. The Communists managed to hold on as despots a decade longer. But as political leaders, they were finished. Visiting his native Poland in 1979, Pope John Paul II struck what turned out to be a mortal blow to its Communist regime, to the Soviet Empire, [and] ultimately to Communism.

"When Pope John Paul II kissed the ground at the Warsaw airport he began the process by which Communism in Poland—and ultimately elsewhere in Europe—would come to an end."

On later trips to Poland, he gave tacit support to the Solidarity organisation. These visits reinforced this message and contributed to the collapse of East European Communism that took place between 1989 and 1990 with the reintroduction of democracy in Poland, and which then spread through Eastern Europe (1990–1991) and South-Eastern Europe (1990–1992).

=== World Youth Days ===
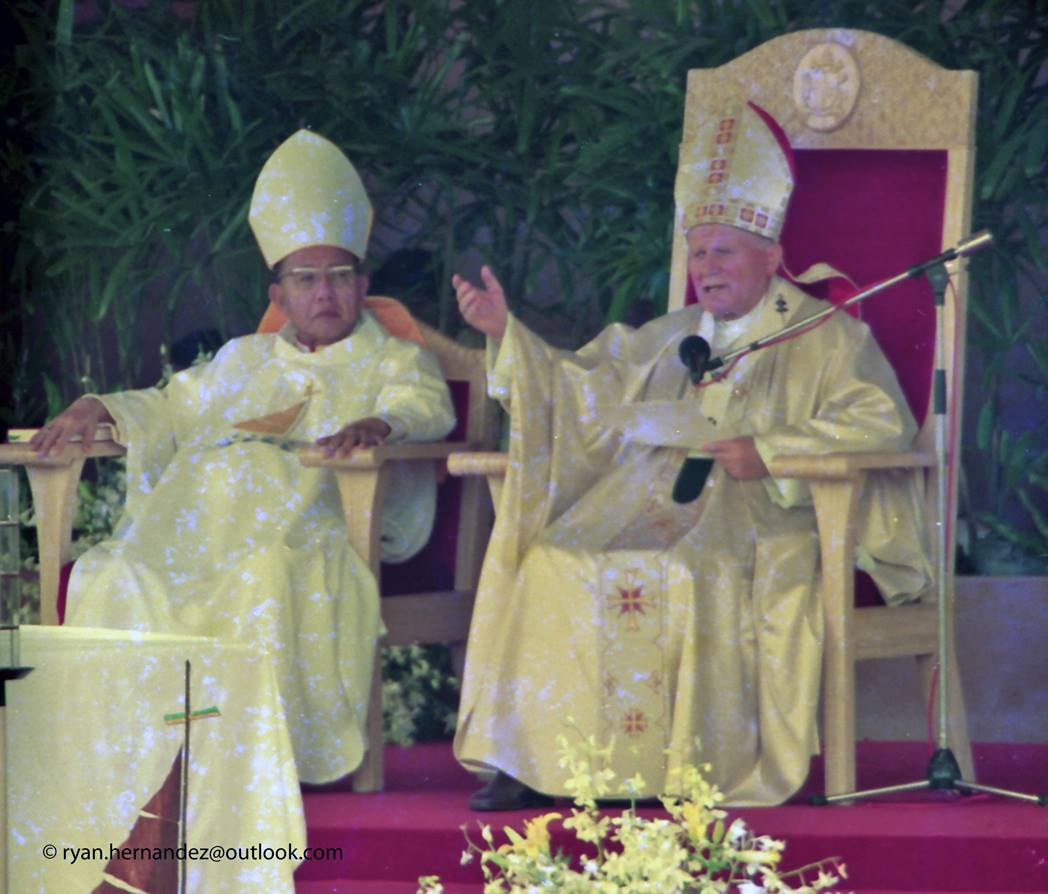
Pope John Paul II (right) with Cardinal Jaime Sin, Archbishop of Manila (left), addressing the crowd attending the closing Mass of the tenth World Youth Day at Luneta Park, 1995

As an extension of his successful work with youth as a young priest, John Paul II pioneered the international World Youth Days. John Paul II presided over nine of them: Rome (1985 and 2000), Buenos Aires (1987), Santiago de Compostela (1989), Częstochowa (1991), Denver (1993), Manila (1995), Paris (1997), and Toronto (2002). Total attendance at these signature events of the pontificate was in the tens of millions.

John Paul II said in Ireland that: "I believe in youth with all my heart and with all the strength of my conviction." When he visited New York City, he was given a T-shirt, a pair of jeans, a guitar and medal on a chain, symbols associated with a modern, American young adulthood.

=== Dedicated years ===
Keenly aware of the rhythms of time and the importance of anniversaries in the Catholic Church's life, John Paul II led nine "dedicated years" during the twenty-six and a half years of his pontificate: the Holy Year of the Redemption in 1983–84, the Marian Year in 1987–88, the Year of the Family in 1993–94, the three Trinitarian years of preparation for the Great Jubilee of 2000, the Great Jubilee itself, the Year of the Rosary in 2002–03, and the Year of the Eucharist, which began on 17 October 2004, and concluded six months after the Pope's death.

=== Music albums ===
John Paul II recorded music albums. In 1979, his album Pope John Paul II sings at the Festival of Sacrosong was recorded by Infinity Records. In 1994 he released a music album title The Rosary. In 1999, John Paul II released another music album titled Abba Pater.

=== Great Jubilee of 2000 ===
The Great Jubilee of 2000 was a call to the church to become more aware and to embrace her missionary task for the work of evangelization:

From the beginning of my Pontificate, my thoughts had been on this Holy Year 2000 as an important appointment. I thought of its celebration as a providential opportunity during which the Church, thirty-five years after the Second Vatican Ecumenical Council, would examine how far she had renewed herself, in order to be able to take up her evangelising mission with fresh enthusiasm.

John Paul II also made a pilgrimage to the Holy Land for the Great Jubilee of 2000. During his visit to the Holy Land, John Paul II visited many sites of the Rosary, including the following locations: Bethany Beyond the Jordan (Al-Maghtas), at the Jordan River, where John the Baptist baptized Jesus; Manger Square and the Church of the Nativity in the town of Bethlehem, the location of Jesus' birth; and the Church of the Holy Sepulchre in Jerusalem, the site of Jesus' burial and resurrection.

== Teachings ==
As pope, John Paul II wrote 14 papal encyclicals and taught regularly in his general audiences.

Some key elements of his strategy to "reposition the Catholic Church" were encyclicals such as Ecclesia de Eucharistia, Reconciliatio et paenitentia and Redemptoris Mater. In his At the beginning of the new millennium (Novo Millennio Ineunte), he emphasised the importance of "starting afresh from Christ": "No, we shall not be saved by a formula but by a Person." In The Splendour of the Truth (Veritatis Splendor), he emphasised the dependence of man on God and His Law ("Without the Creator, the creature disappears") and the "dependence of freedom on the truth". He warned that man "giving himself over to relativism and scepticism, goes off in search of an illusory freedom apart from truth itself". In Fides et Ratio (On the Relationship between Faith and Reason) John Paul promoted a renewed interest in philosophy and an autonomous pursuit of truth in theological matters. Drawing on many different sources (such as Thomism), he described the mutually supporting relationship between faith and reason, and emphasised that theologians should focus on that relationship. John Paul II wrote extensively about workers and the social doctrine of the church, which he discussed in three encyclicals: Laborem exercens, Sollicitudo rei socialis, and Centesimus annus. Through his encyclicals and many Apostolic Letters and Exhortations, John Paul II talked about the dignity and the equality of women. He argued for the importance of the family for the future of humanity. He taught about sexuality in what is referred as the "Theology of the Body". Other encyclicals include The Gospel of Life (Evangelium Vitae) and Ut unum sint (That They May Be One). Though critics accused him of inflexibility in explicitly re-asserting Catholic moral teachings against abortion and euthanasia that have been in place for well over a thousand years, he urged a more nuanced view of capital punishment. In his second encyclical, Dives in misericordia, he stressed that divine mercy is the greatest feature of God, needed especially in modern times.

== Promulgation of 1983 Code of Canon Law and 1992 Catechism of the Catholic Church ==
John Paul II completed a full-scale reform of the Catholic Church's legal system, Latin and Eastern, and a reform of the Roman Curia.

On 18 October 1990, when promulgating the Code of Canons of the Eastern Churches, John Paul II stated

By the publication of this Code, the canonical ordering of the whole Church is thus at length completed, following as it does...the "Apostolic Constitution on the Roman Curia" of 1988, which is added to both Codes as the primary instrument of the Roman Pontiff for 'the communion that binds together, as it were, the whole Church'

In 1998, John Paul II issued the motu proprio Ad tuendam fidem, which amended two canons (750 and 1371) of the 1983 Code of Canon Law and two canons (598 and 1436) of the 1990 Code of Canons of the Eastern Churches.

=== 1983 Code of Canon Law ===
On 25 January 1983, with the apostolic constitution Sacrae disciplinae leges John Paul II promulgated the current code of canon law for all members of the Catholic Church who belonged to the Latin Church. It entered into force the first Sunday of the following Advent, which was 27 November 1983. John Paul II described the new code as "the last document of Vatican II". Edward N. Peters has referred to the 1983 Code as the "Johanno-Pauline Code" (Johannes Paulus is Latin for "John Paul"), parallelling the "Pio-Benedictine" 1917 code that it replaced.

=== Code of Canons of the Eastern Churches ===
John Paul II promulgated the Code of Canons of the Eastern Churches (CCEO) on 18 October 1990, by the document Sacri Canones. The CCEO came into force of law on 1 October 1991. It is the codification of the common portions of the canon law for the 23 of the 24 sui iuris churches in the Catholic Church that are the Eastern Catholic Churches. It is divided into 30 titles and has a total of 1540 canons.

=== Pastor bonus ===
John Paul II promulgated the apostolic constitution Pastor bonus on 28 June 1988. It instituted a number of reforms in the process of running the Roman Curia. Pastor bonus laid out in considerable detail the organisation of the Roman Curia, specifying precisely the names and composition of each dicastery, and enumerating the competencies of each dicastery. It replaced the previous special law, Regimini Ecclesiæ universæ, which was promulgated by Paul VI in 1967.

=== Catechism of the Catholic Church ===
On 11 October 1992, in his apostolic constitution Fidei depositum (The Deposit of Faith), John Paul ordered the publication of the Catechism of the Catholic Church.

He declared the publication to be "a sure norm for teaching the faith … a sure and authentic reference text for teaching Catholic doctrine and particularly for preparing local catechisms". It was "meant to encourage and assist in the writing of new local catechisms [both applicable and faithful]" rather than replacing them.

== Political views and activity ==
=== Views on contraception ===
John Paul II continued the tradition of advocating for the culture of life. In solidarity with Pope Paul VI's Humanae vitae, he rejected artificial birth control, even in the use of condoms to prevent the spread of AIDS. John Paul II argued that the proper way to prevent the spread of AIDS was not condoms but rather "correct practice of sexuality, which presupposes chastity and fidelity".

=== Hardline Protestantism ===
Hardline protestants opposed John Paul II due to his support for Catholicism around the world including Northern Ireland. In 1988, when John Paul II was delivering a speech to the European Parliament, Ian Paisley, the leader of the Democratic Unionist Party and Moderator of the General Assembly of the Free Presbyterian Church of Ulster, shouted: "I denounce you as the Antichrist!" He held up a red banner reading "Pope John Paul II ANTICHRIST". Otto von Habsburg (the last Crown Prince of Austria-Hungary), a Member of the European Parliament (MEP) for Germany, snatched Paisley's banner, tore it up, and along with other MEPs helped eject him from the chamber. The Pope continued with his address after Paisley had been ejected.

=== Anti-communism ===
==== Role as spiritual inspiration and catalyst ====
By the late 1970s, the dissolution of the Soviet Union had been predicted by some observers. John Paul II has been credited with being instrumental in bringing down Communism in Central and Eastern Europe, by being the spiritual inspiration behind its downfall and catalyst for "a peaceful revolution" in Poland. Lech Wałęsa, the founder of Solidarity and the first post-Communist President of Poland, credited John Paul II with giving Poles the courage to demand change. According to Wałęsa, "Before his pontificate, the world was divided into blocs. Nobody knew how to get rid of Communism. In Warsaw, in 1979, he simply said: 'Do not be afraid', and later prayed: 'Let your Spirit descend and change the image of the land ... this land'." It has also been widely alleged that the Vatican Bank covertly funded Solidarity.

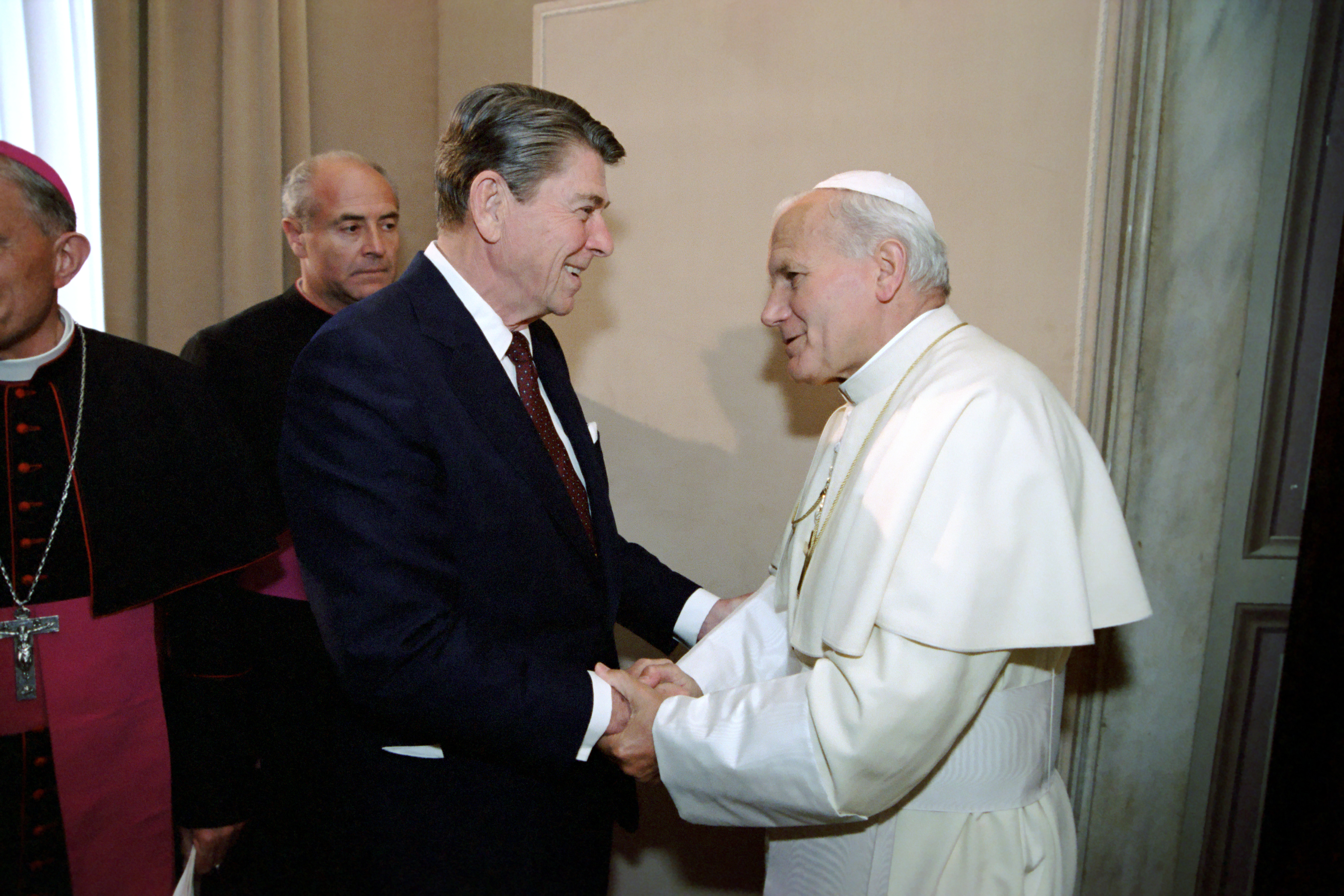
US President Ronald Reagan meeting with Pope John Paul II during a visit to the Vatican City, 1982

In 1984, the foreign policy of the Ronald Reagan administration saw opened diplomatic relations with the Vatican for the first time since 1870. In sharp contrast to the long history of strong domestic opposition, this time there was very little opposition from Congress, the courts, and Protestant groups. Relations between Reagan and John Paul II were close, especially because of their shared anti-communism and keen interest in forcing the Soviets out of Poland. John Paul II and Reagan had earlier confided in the Vatican (in 1982) "their conviction that God had spared their lives" from assassination "for the divine purpose of defeating the communist empire." Reagan's correspondence with the Pope reveals "a continuous scurrying to shore up Vatican support for U.S. policies. Perhaps most surprisingly, the papers show that, as late as 1984, the Pope did not believe the Communist Polish government could be changed."

"No one can prove conclusively that he was a primary cause of the end of communism. However, the major figures on all sides—not just Lech Wałęsa, the Polish Solidarity leader, but also Solidarity's arch-opponent, General Wojciech Jaruzelski; not just the former American president George Bush Senior but also the former Soviet president Mikhail Gorbachev—now agree that he was. I would argue the historical case in three steps: without the Polish Pope, no Solidarity revolution in Poland in 1980; without Solidarity, no dramatic change in Soviet policy towards eastern Europe under Gorbachev; without that change, no velvet revolutions in 1989."

In December 1989, John Paul II met the Soviet leader Mikhail Gorbachev at the Vatican and each expressed his respect and admiration for the other. Gorbachev once said: "The collapse of the Iron Curtain would have been impossible without John Paul II." On John Paul II's death, Gorbachev said: "Pope John Paul II's devotion to his followers is a remarkable example to all of us."

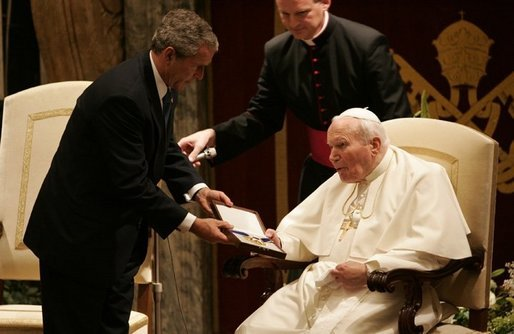
Pope John Paul II, given the Presidential Medal of Freedom by US President George W. Bush in 2004

On 4 June 2004, U.S. president George W. Bush presented the Presidential Medal of Freedom, the United States' highest civilian honour, to John Paul II during a ceremony at the Apostolic Palace. The president read the citation that accompanied the medal, which recognised "this son of Poland" whose "principled stand for peace and freedom has inspired millions and helped to topple communism and tyranny". After receiving the award, John Paul II said, "May the desire for freedom, peace, a more humane world symbolised by this medal inspire men and women of goodwill in every time and place."

==== Communist attempt to compromise John Paul II ====
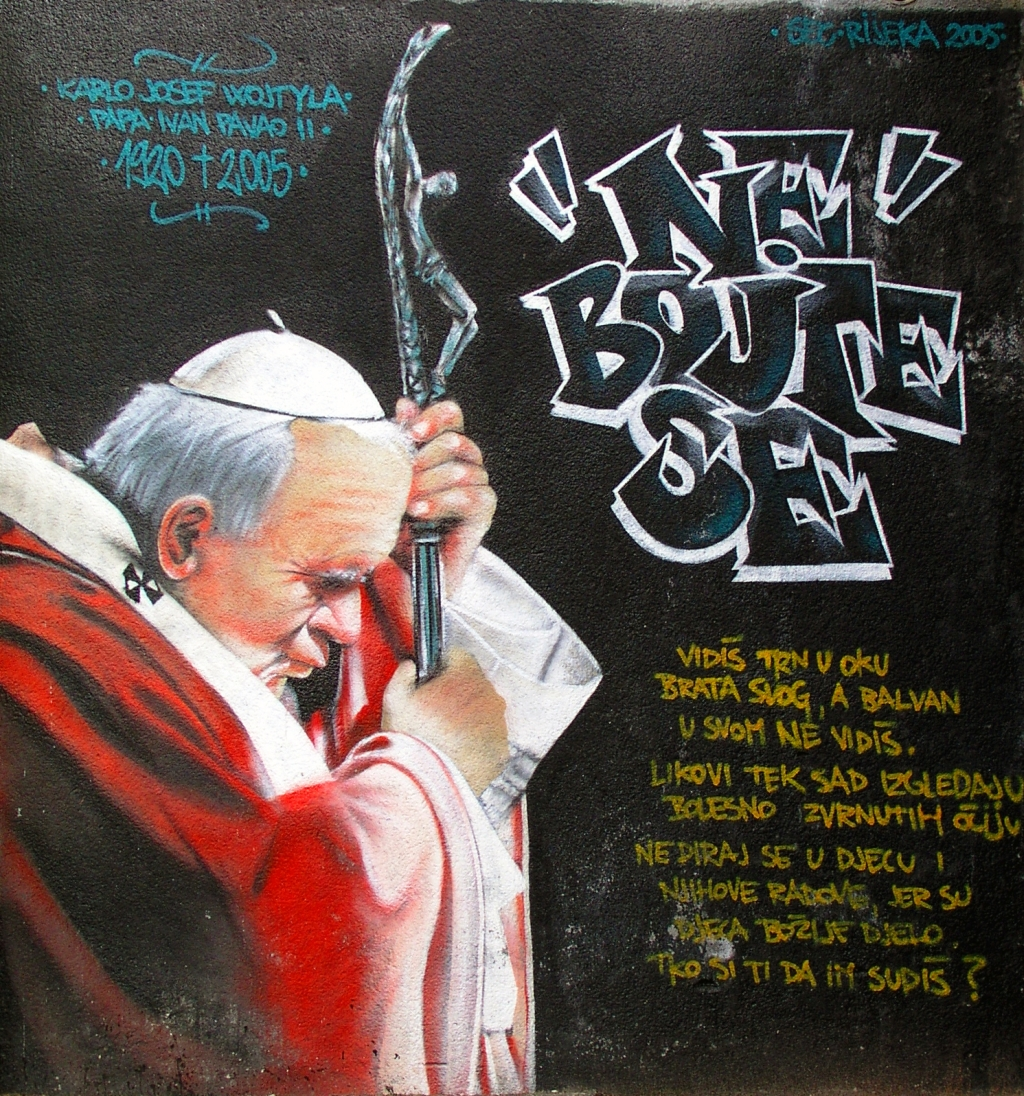
Graffiti showing John Paul II with quote "Do not be afraid" in Rijeka, Croatia

In 1983, Poland's Communist government unsuccessfully tried to humiliate John Paul II by falsely saying he had fathered an illegitimate child. Section D of Służba Bezpieczeństwa (SB), the security service, had an action named "Triangolo" to carry out criminal operations against the Catholic Church in Poland; the operation encompassed all Polish hostile actions against the Pope. Captain Grzegorz Piotrowski, one of the murderers of beatified Jerzy Popiełuszko, was the leader of section D. They drugged Irena Kinaszewska, the secretary of the Kraków-based weekly Catholic magazine Tygodnik Powszechny where Wojtyła had worked, and unsuccessfully attempted to make her admit to having had sexual relations with him.

The SB then attempted to compromise Kraków priest Andrzej Bardecki, an editor of Tygodnik Powszechny and one of the closest friends of Cardinal Wojtyła before he became pope, by planting false memoirs in his dwelling; Piotrowski was exposed and the forgeries were found and destroyed before the SB could say to have discovered them.

=== Latin American and Caribbean dictatorships ===
John Paul II was variously praised and criticized for actions which were perceived as both inspiring resistance but also potentially abetting dictatorships in Chile, Haiti, and Paraguay.

John Paul II endorsed Cardinal Pio Laghi, who critics say supported the Dirty War in Argentina and was on friendly terms with the Argentine generals of the military dictatorship, playing regular tennis matches with the Navy's representative in the junta, Admiral Emilio Eduardo Massera.

== Interfaith & ecumenical relations ==
=== Christian denominations ===
John Paul II was publicly committed to improving relationships between Christian communities and engaged in numerous dialogues with leaders of other Christian churches, including the Eastern Orthodox Church, Oriental Orthodox Church, Assyrian Church of the East the Lutheran World Federation, and the Anglican Communion.

=== Religions ===
==== Judaism ====
Relations between Catholicism and Judaism improved dramatically during the pontificate of John Paul II. He spoke frequently about the Catholic Church's relationship with the Jewish faith.

==== Animism ====
In his book-length interview Crossing the Threshold of Hope with the Italian journalist Vittorio Messori published in 1995, John Paul II draws parallels between animism and Christianity. He wrote:

"... it would be helpful to recall ... the animist religions which stress ancestor worship. It seems that those who practise them are particularly close to Christianity, and among them, the Church's missionaries also find it easier to speak a common language. Is there, perhaps, in this veneration of ancestors a kind of preparation for the Christian faith in the Communion of Saints, in which all believers—whether living or dead—form a single community, a single body? ... There is nothing strange, then, that the African and Asian animists would become believers in Christ more easily than followers of the great religions of the Far East."

In 1985, the Pope visited the African country of Togo, where 60 per cent of the population espouses animist beliefs. To honour the Pope, animist religious leaders met him at a Catholic Marian shrine in the forest, much to the pontiff's delight. John Paul II proceeded to call for the need for religious tolerance, praised nature, and emphasised common elements between animism and Christianity, saying:

"Nature, exuberant and splendid in this area of forests and lakes, impregnates spirits and hearts with its mystery and orients them spontaneously toward the mystery of He who is the author of life. It is this religious sentiment that animates you and one can say that animates all of your compatriots."

During the investiture of President Thomas Boni Yayi of Benin as a titled Yoruba chieftain on 20 December 2008, the reigning Ooni of Ile-Ife, Nigeria, Olubuse II, referred to John Paul II as a previous recipient of the same royal honour.

==== Buddhism ====
Tenzin Gyatso, the 14th Dalai Lama, visited John Paul II eight times. The two men held many similar views and understood similar plights, both coming from nations affected by Communism and both serving as heads of major religious bodies. As Archbishop of Kraków, long before the 14th Dalai Lama was a world-famous figure, Wojtyła held special Masses to pray for the Tibetan people's non-violent struggle for freedom from Maoist China. In 1987, he welcomed participants of the East-West Spiritual Exchanges, an initiative by the Monastic Interreligious Dialogue (DIMMID) and the Institute for Zen Studies in which Buddhist and Christian monks or nuns take turns residing for one month in each other's monasteries. During his 1995 visit to Sri Lanka, a country where a majority of the population adheres to Theravada Buddhism, John Paul II expressed his admiration for Buddhism. He said:

"In particular I express my highest regard for the followers of Buddhism, the majority religion in Sri Lanka, with its ... four great values of … loving kindness, compassion, sympathetic joy and equanimity; with its ten transcendental virtues and the joys of the Sangha expressed so beautifully in the Theragathas. I ardently hope that my visit will serve to strengthen the goodwill between us, and that it will reassure everyone of the Catholic Church's desire for interreligious dialogue and cooperation in building a more just and fraternal world. To everyone I extend the hand of friendship, recalling the splendid words of the Dhammapada: 'Better than a thousand useless words is one single word that gives peace' ... ."

==== Islam ====
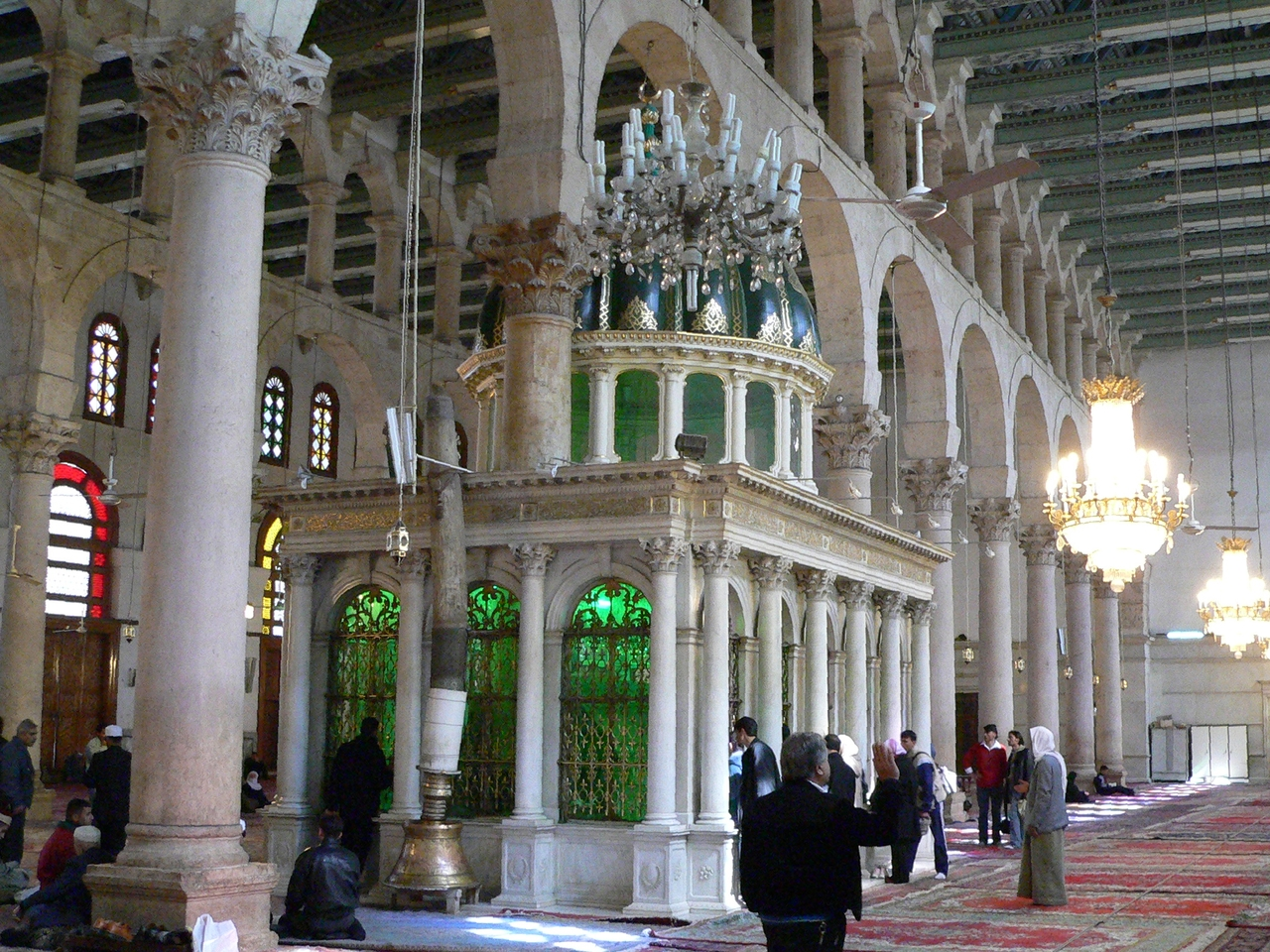
John Paul II was the first Pope to enter and pray in a mosque, visiting the tomb of John the Baptist at Umayyad Mosque, Damascus.

John Paul II made considerable efforts to improve relations between Catholicism and Islam.

He officially supported the project of the Mosque of Rome and participated in the inauguration in 1995.

On 14 May 1999, at a meeting with Muslim leaders in Syria, he was gifted and then promptly kissed a Qur'an, an act that was controversial with some Catholics.

On 6 May 2001, he became the first Catholic pope to enter and pray in a mosque, namely the Umayyad Mosque in Damascus, Syria. Respectfully removing his shoes, he entered the former Byzantine-era Christian church dedicated to John the Baptist, who is also revered as a prophet of Islam. He gave a speech including the statement: "For all the times that Muslims and Christians have offended one another, we need to seek forgiveness from the Almighty and to offer each other forgiveness."

In 2004, John Paul II hosted the "Papal Concert of Reconciliation", which brought together leaders of Islam with leaders of the Jewish community and of the Catholic Church at the Vatican for a concert by the Kraków Philharmonic Choir from Poland, the London Philharmonic Choir from the United Kingdom, the Pittsburgh Symphony Orchestra from the United States, and the Ankara State Polyphonic Choir of Turkey. The event was conceived and conducted by Gilbert Levine, KCSG and was broadcast throughout the world.

John Paul II oversaw the publication of the Catechism of the Catholic Church, which makes a special provision for Muslims; therein, it is written, "together with us they adore the one, merciful God, mankind's judge on the last day."

==== Jainism ====
In 1995, John Paul II held a meeting with 21 Jains, organised by the Pontifical Council for Interreligious Dialogue. He praised Mohandas Gandhi for his "unshakeable faith in God", assured the Jains that the Catholic Church will continue to engage in dialogue with their religion and spoke of the common need to aid the poor. The Jain leaders were impressed with the Pope's "transparency and simplicity", and the meeting received much attention in the Gujarat state in western India, home to many Jains.

==== Opus Dei and traditional Catholics ====
John Paul II was criticised for his support of the Opus Dei prelature and the 2002 canonisation of its founder, Josemaría Escrivá, whom he called "the saint of ordinary life". Other movements and religious organisations of the church went decidedly under his wing Legion of Christ, the Neocatechumenal Way, Schoenstatt, the Charismatic Movement, etc. And he was accused repeatedly of taking a soft hand with them, especially in the case of Marcial Maciel, founder of the Legionaries of Christ.

In 1984 John Paul II appointed Joaquín Navarro-Valls, a member of Opus Dei, as Director of the Vatican Press Office. An Opus Dei spokesman said that "the influence of Opus Dei in the Vatican has been exaggerated". Of the nearly 200 cardinals in the Catholic Church, only two are known to be members of Opus Dei.

Pope John Paul II was said to engage in Self-flagellation, a practice of whipping oneself which is often used within Opus Dei.

John Paul II was criticised by some traditionalist Catholics, in addition to those demanding modernisation. Points of contention with traditionalists included demanding a return to the Tridentine Mass, as well as the repudiation of reforms instituted after the Second Vatican Council, such as the use of the vernacular language in the formerly Latin-language Roman Rite, ecumenism, and the principle of religious liberty. In 1988, the controversial traditionalist Archbishop Marcel Lefebvre, founder of the Society of Saint Pius X (1970), was excommunicated under John Paul II because of the unapproved ordination of four bishops, which Cardinal Ratzinger called a "schismatic act".

The World Day of Prayer for Peace, a 1986 meeting in Assisi, Italy in which the pope prayed only with Christians, was criticised for giving the impression that syncretism and indifferentism were openly embraced by the Papal Magisterium. When a second Day of Prayer for Peace in the World was held in 2002, it was condemned as confusing the laity and compromising to false religions. Likewise criticised was his kissing of the Qur'an in Damascus, Syria, on one of his travels on 6 May 2001. His call for religious freedom was not always supported; bishops like Antônio de Castro Mayer promoted religious tolerance but at the same time rejected the Vatican II principle of religious liberty as being liberalist and already condemned by Pope Pius IX in his Syllabus errorum (1864) and at the First Vatican Council.

== Assassination attempts and plots ==
As he entered St. Peter's Square to address an audience on 13 May 1981, John Paul II was shot and critically wounded by Mehmet Ali Ağca, an expert Turkish gunman who was a member of the militant fascist group Grey Wolves. The assassin used a Browning 9 mm semi-automatic pistol, shooting the Pope in the abdomen and perforating his colon and small intestine multiple times. John Paul II was rushed into the Vatican complex and then to the Gemelli Hospital. On the way to the hospital, he lost consciousness. Even though the two bullets missed his superior mesenteric artery and abdominal aorta, he lost nearly three-quarters of his blood. He underwent five hours of surgery to treat his wounds. Surgeons performed a colostomy, temporarily rerouting the upper part of the large intestine to let the damaged lower part heal. When he briefly regained consciousness before being operated on, he instructed the doctors not to remove his Brown Scapular during the operation. One of the few people allowed in to see him at the Gemelli Clinic was one of his closest friends, philosopher Anna-Teresa Tymieniecka, who arrived on Saturday 16 May and kept him company while he recovered from emergency surgery. The Pope later stated that the Blessed Virgin Mary helped keep him alive throughout his ordeal. He said:

"Could I forget that the event in St. Peter's Square took place on the day and at the hour when the first appearance of the Mother of Christ to the poor little peasants has been remembered for over sixty years at Fátima, Portugal? For in everything that happened to me on that very day, I felt that extraordinary motherly protection and care, which turned out to be stronger than the deadly bullet."

Ağca was caught and restrained by a nun and other bystanders until police arrived. He was sentenced to life imprisonment. Two days after Christmas in 1983, John Paul II visited Ağca in prison. John Paul II and Ağca spoke privately for about twenty minutes. John Paul II said, "What we talked about will have to remain a secret between him and me. I spoke to him as a brother whom I have pardoned and who has my complete trust."

Numerous theories were advanced to explain the assassination attempt, some of them controversial. One such theory, advanced by Michael Ledeen and heavily pushed by the United States Central Intelligence Agency at the time of the assassination but never substantiated by evidence, was that the Soviet Union was behind the attempt on John Paul II's life in retaliation for the Pope's support of Solidarity, the Catholic, pro-democratic Polish workers' movement. This theory was supported by the 2006 Mitrokhin Commission, set up by Silvio Berlusconi and headed by Forza Italia senator Paolo Guzzanti, which alleged that Communist Bulgarian security departments were used to prevent the Soviet Union's role from being uncovered, and concluded that Soviet military intelligence (Glavnoje Razvedyvatel'noje Upravlenije), not the KGB, were responsible. Russian Foreign Intelligence Service spokesman Boris Labusov called the accusation "absurd". The Pope declared during a May 2002 visit to Bulgaria that the country's Soviet-bloc-era leadership had nothing to do with the assassination attempt. However, his secretary, Cardinal Stanisław Dziwisz, alleged in his book A Life with Karol, that the Pope was convinced privately that the former Soviet Union was behind the attack. It was later discovered that many of John Paul II's aides had foreign-government attachments; Bulgaria and Russia disputed the Italian commission's conclusions, pointing out that the Pope had publicly denied the Bulgarian connection.

A second assassination attempt was made on 12 May 1982, just a day before the anniversary of the first attempt on his life, in Fátima, Portugal, when a man tried to stab John Paul II with a bayonet. He was stopped by security guards. Stanisław Dziwisz later said that John Paul II had been injured during the attempt but managed to hide a non-life-threatening wound. The assailant, a traditionalist Catholic Spanish priest named Juan María Fernández y Krohn, had been ordained as a priest by Archbishop Marcel Lefebvre of the Society of St. Pius X and was opposed to the changes made by the Second Vatican Council, saying that the Pope was an agent of Communist Moscow and of the Marxist Eastern Bloc. Fernández y Krohn subsequently left the priesthood and served three years of a six-year sentence. The ex-priest was treated for mental illness and then expelled from Portugal to become a solicitor in Belgium.

The Al-Qaeda-funded Bojinka plot planned to kill John Paul II during a visit to the Philippines during World Youth Day 1995 celebrations. On 15 January 1995 a suicide bomber was planning to dress as a priest and detonate a bomb when the Pope passed in his motorcade on his way to the San Carlos Seminary in Makati. The assassination was supposed to divert attention from the next phase of the operation. However, a chemical fire inadvertently started by the cell alerted police to their whereabouts, and all were arrested a week before the Pope's visit, and confessed to the plot.

In 2009 Jack Koehler, a journalist and former army intelligence officer, published Spies in the Vatican: The Soviet Union's Cold War Against the Catholic Church. Mining mostly East German and Polish secret police archives, Koehler claimed the assassination attempts were "KGB-backed".

== Apologies ==
John Paul II apologised to many groups that had suffered at the hands of the Catholic Church through the years. Before becoming pope he had been a prominent editor and supporter of initiatives such as the Letter of Reconciliation of the Polish Bishops to the German Bishops from 1965. As pope, he officially made public apologies for more than 100 wrongdoings, including:

- The legal process on the Italian scientist and philosopher Galileo Galilei, himself a devout Catholic, around 1633 (31 October 1992).
- The involvement of Catholics in the Atlantic slave trade (9 August 1993).
- The church hierarchy's role in burnings at the stake and the religious wars that followed the Protestant Reformation (20 May 1995, in the Czech Republic).
- The injustices committed against women, the violation of women's rights and the historical denigration of women (10 July 1995, in a letter to "every woman").
- The inactivity and silence of many Catholics during the Holocaust (see the article Religion in Nazi Germany) (16 March 1998).

The Great Jubilee of the year 2000 included a day of Prayer for Forgiveness of the Sins of the Church on 12 March 2000.

On 20 November 2001, from a laptop in the Vatican, John Paul II sent his first e-mail apologising for the Catholic sex abuse cases, the church-backed Stolen Generations of Aboriginal children in Australia, and to China for the behaviour of Catholic missionaries in colonial times.

== Health ==
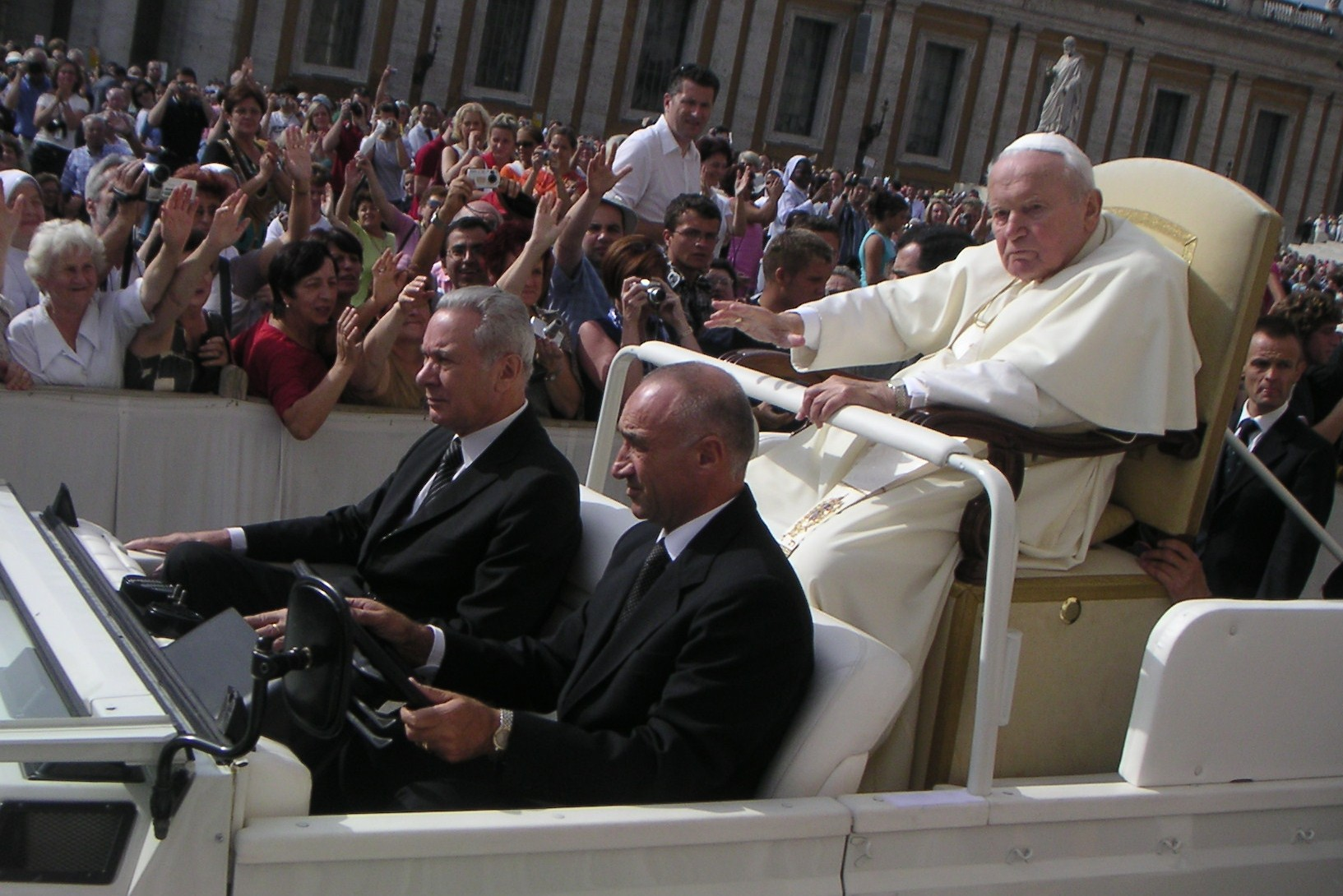
An ailing John Paul II riding in the Popemobile in September 2004 in St. Peter's Square

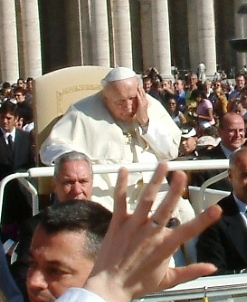
John Paul II during a general audience in September 2004

When he became pope in 1978 at the age of 58, John Paul II was an avid sportsman who enjoyed hiking, swimming, weight training, and skiing, and was seen jogging in the Vatican gardens. When the cost of installing a swimming pool in his summer residence was queried by cardinals, the pope joked that it was "cheaper than another conclave". The media contrasted his athleticism and trim figure with the poor health of John Paul I and Paul VI, the portliness of John XXIII, and the constant claims of ailments of Pius XII. The only modern pope with a fitness regimen had been Pope Pius XI (1922–1939), an avid mountaineer who conquered summits including Monte Rosa, Mont Blanc, and the Matterhorn. An Irish Independent article in the 1980s labelled him the keep-fit pope, and an Italian newspaper called him l'atleta di Dio ("God's athlete") in 2005.

His health held through the 1980s, but began to unravel in the 1990s. A benign intestinal tumour was removed in 1992. He dislocated his shoulder in a fall in 1993 and broke his femur in another fall in 1994. In December 1995 he cut short his urbi et orbi blessing on Christmas Day after a dizzy spell. He underwent an appendectomy in 1996. In 2001 an orthopaedic surgeon confirmed he was suffering from Parkinson's disease, something international observers had long suspected. The Vatican acknowledged it publicly in 2003. Despite difficulty speaking more than a few sentences at a time, trouble hearing, and severe osteoarthrosis, he continued to tour the world, rarely walking in public.

== Death and funeral ==
=== Final months ===
John Paul II was hospitalised with breathing problems caused by a bout of influenza on 1 February 2005. He left the hospital on 10 February, but was subsequently hospitalised again with breathing problems two weeks later and underwent a tracheotomy.

=== Final illness and death ===
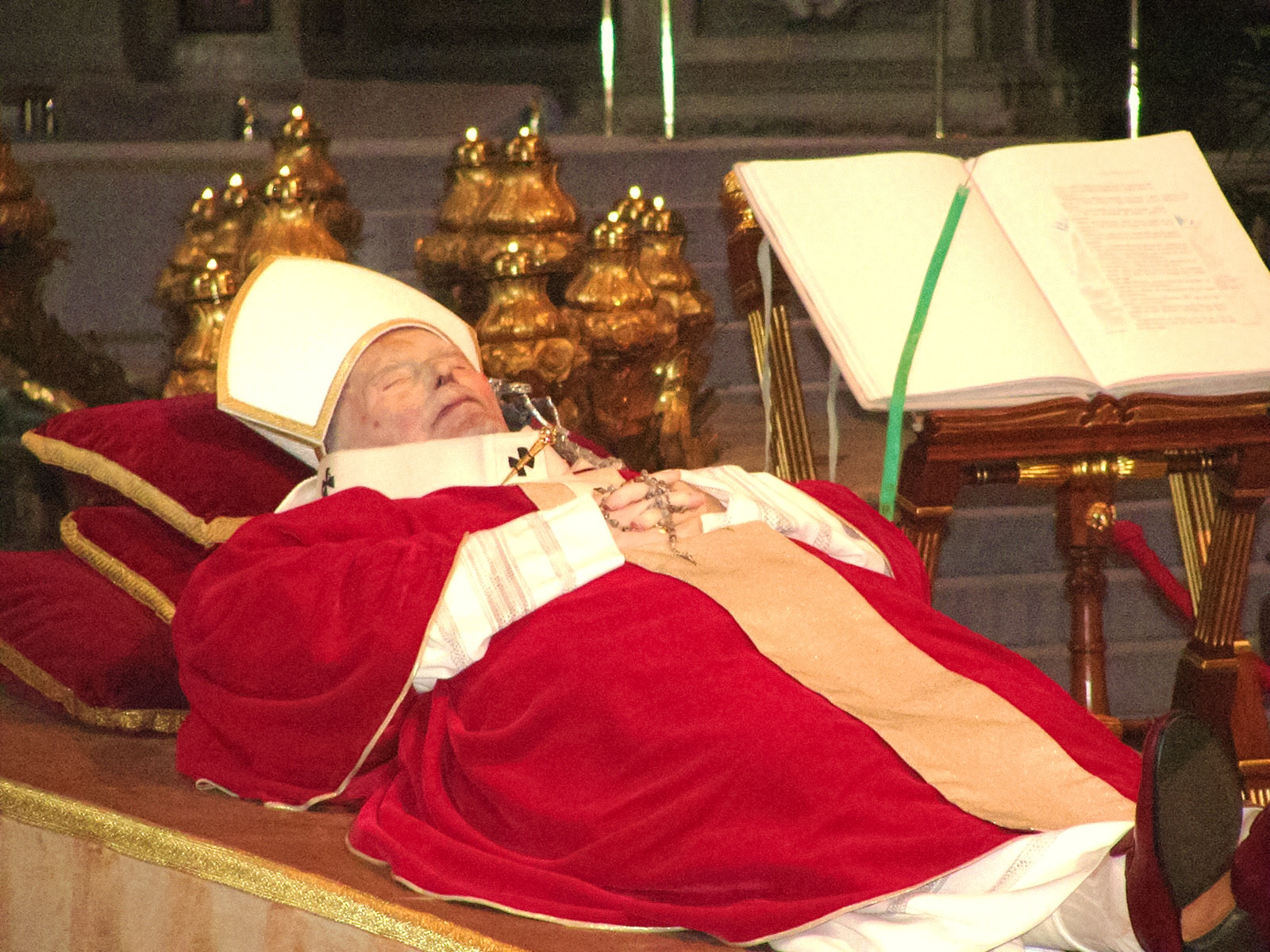
The body of Pope John Paul II lying in state

On 31 March 2005, following a urinary tract infection, he developed septic shock, a form of infection with a high fever and low blood pressure, but was not hospitalised. Instead, he was monitored by a team of consultants at his private residence. This was taken as an indication by the Pope, and those close to him, that he was nearing death; it would have been in accordance with his wishes to die in the Vatican. Later that day, Vatican sources announced that John Paul II had been given the Anointing of the Sick by his friend and secretary Stanisław Dziwisz. The day before his death, one of his closest personal friends, Anna-Teresa Tymieniecka, visited him at his bedside. During the final days of the Pope's life, the lights were kept burning through the night where he lay in the Papal apartment on the top floor of the Apostolic Palace. Tens of thousands of people assembled and held vigil in St. Peter's Square and the surrounding streets for two days. Upon hearing of this, the dying pope was said to have stated: "I have searched for you, and now you have come to me, and I thank you."

On Saturday, 2 April 2005, at approximately 15:30 CEST, John Paul II spoke his final words in Polish, "Pozwólcie mi odejść do domu Ojca" ("Allow me to depart to the house of the Father"), to his aides, and fell into a coma about four hours later. The Mass of the vigil of the Second Sunday of Easter commemorating the canonisation of Faustina Kowalska on 30 April 2000, had just been celebrated at his bedside, presided over by Dziwisz and two Polish associates. Present at the bedside was Cardinal Lubomyr Husar from Ukraine, who served as a priest with John Paul in Poland, along with Polish nuns of the Congregation of the Sisters, Servants of the Most Sacred Heart of Jesus, who ran the papal household. John Paul II died in his private apartment at 21:37 CEST (19:37 UTC) of heart failure from profound hypotension and complete circulatory collapse from septic shock. His death was verified when an electrocardiogram that ran for 20 minutes showed a flatline.

He had no close family by the time of his death; his feelings are reflected in his words written in 2000 at the end of his Last Will and Testament. Dziwisz later said he had not burned the pontiff's personal notes despite the request being part of the will.

=== Aftermath ===
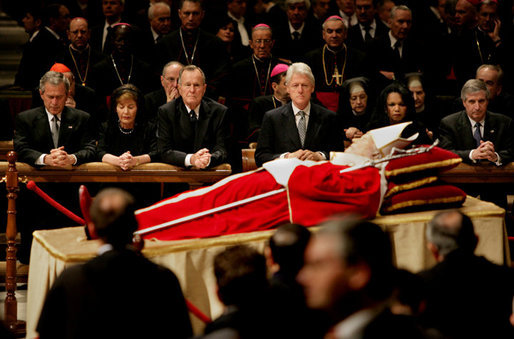
(l-r) George W. Bush, Laura Bush, George H. W. Bush, Bill Clinton, Condoleezza Rice, and Andrew Card, US dignitaries paying respects to John Paul II on 6 April 2005 at St. Peter's Basilica, Vatican City

The death of the pontiff set in motion rituals and traditions dating back to medieval times. The Rite of Visitation took place from 4 April 2005 to 7 April 2005 at St. Peter's Basilica. John Paul II's testament, published on 7 April 2005, revealed that he contemplated being buried in his native Poland but left the final decision to the College of Cardinals, who preferred burial beneath St. Peter's Basilica, honouring the pontiff's request to be placed "in bare earth".

The Requiem Mass held on 8 April 2005 was said to have set world records both for attendance and number of heads of state present at a funeral. (See: List of Dignitaries.) It was the single largest gathering of heads of state up to that time, surpassing the funerals of Winston Churchill (1965) and Josip Broz Tito (1980). Four kings, five queens, at least 70 presidents and prime ministers, and more than 14 leaders of other religions attended. An estimated four million mourners gathered in and around Vatican City. Between 250,000 and 300,000 watched the event from within the Vatican's walls. In a historical rarity, Protestant and Eastern Orthodox leaders, as well as representatives and heads from Judaism, Islam, Druze and Buddhism, offered their own memorials and prayers as a way of sympathising with the grief of Catholics.

The Dean of the College of Cardinals, Cardinal Joseph Ratzinger, conducted the ceremony. John Paul II was interred in the grottoes under the basilica, the Tomb of the Popes. He was lowered into a tomb created in the same alcove previously occupied by the remains of John XXIII. The alcove had been empty since John XXIII's remains had been moved into the main body of the basilica after his beatification. The remains of John Paul II were moved to the Chapel of St. Sebastian within the main basilica upon his own beatification in 2011.

== Legacy ==
=== Posthumous recognition ===
==== Title "the Great" ====
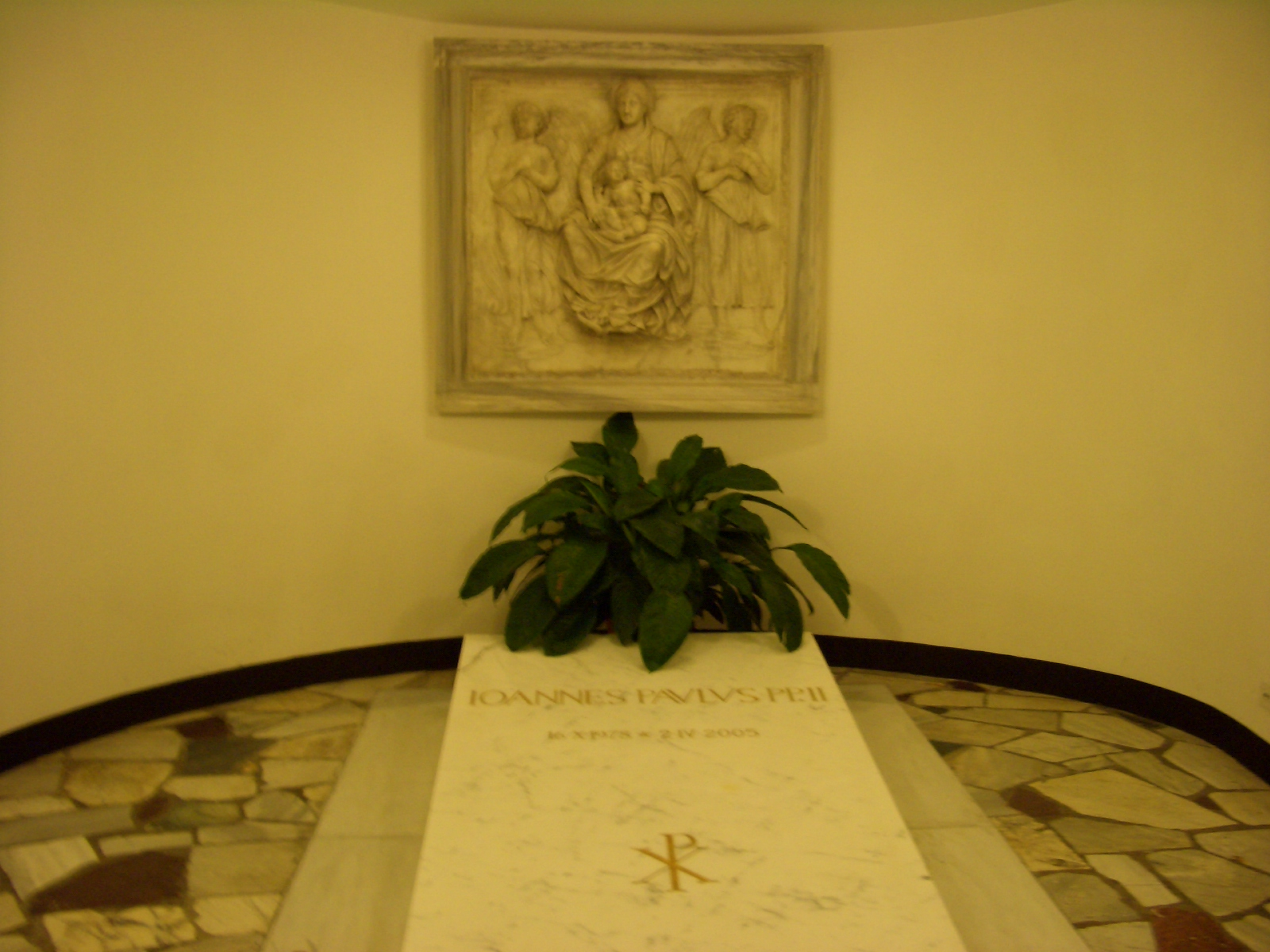
Old tomb of John Paul II in the Vatican Grottoes before his beatification

Upon the death of John Paul II, a number of clergy at the Vatican and laymen began referring to the late pontiff as "John Paul the Great" –in theory only the fourth pope to be so acclaimed. Cardinal Angelo Sodano specifically referred to John Paul as "the Great" in his published written homily for the Pope's funeral Mass of Repose. The South African Catholic newspaper The Southern Cross has referred to him in print as "John Paul II the Great". Some Catholic educational institutions in the US have additionally changed their names to incorporate "the Great", including John Paul the Great Catholic University and schools called some variant of John Paul the Great High School.

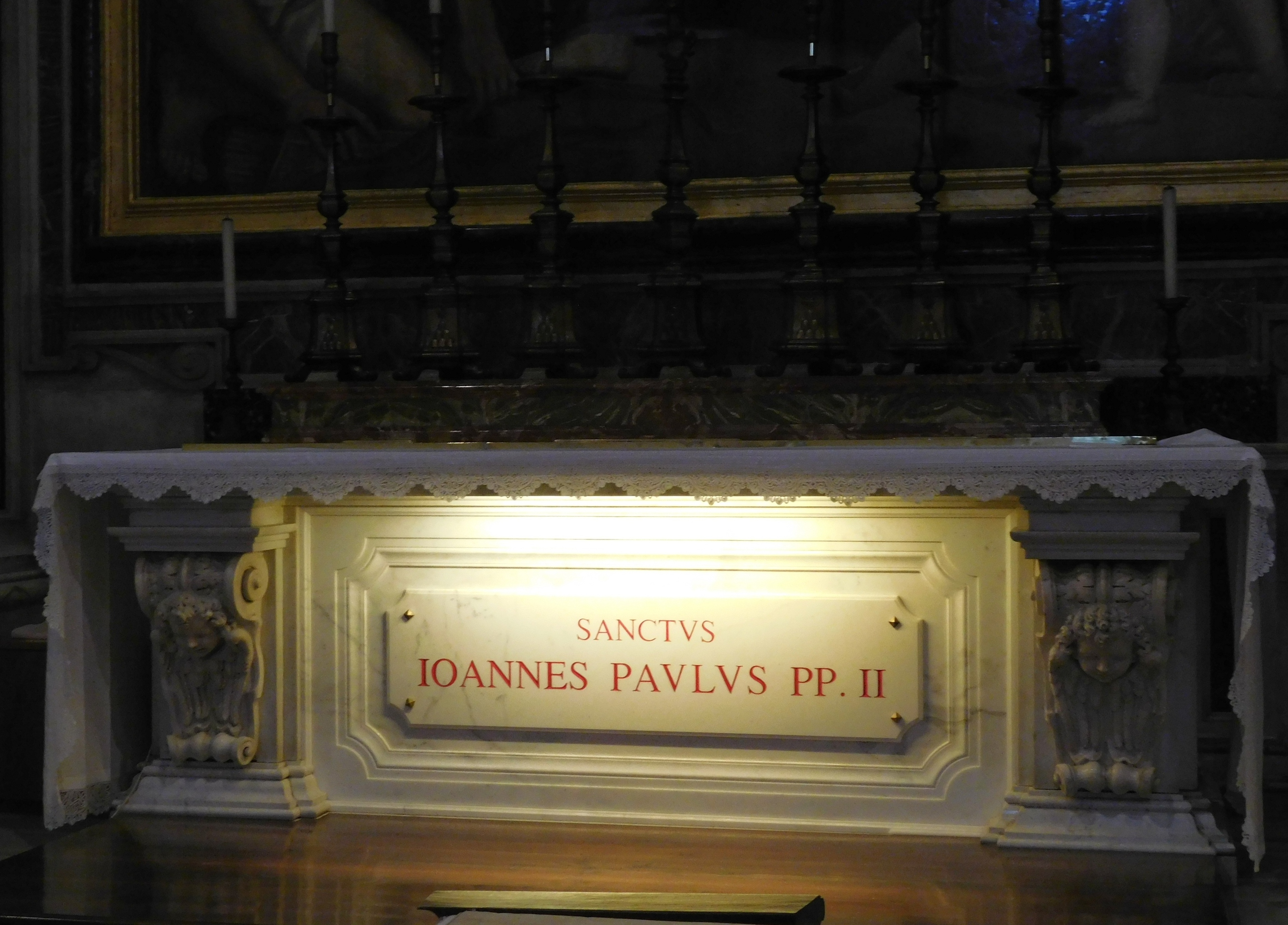
The tomb of John Paul II in the Vatican Chapel of Saint Sebastian within St. Peter's Basilica where it has been since 2011

Scholars of canon law say that there is no official process for declaring a pope "Great"; the title simply establishes itself through popular and continued usage, as was the case with celebrated secular leaders (for example, Alexander III of Macedon became popularly known as Alexander the Great). The three popes who today commonly are known as "Great" are Leo I, who reigned from 440–461 and persuaded Attila the Hun to withdraw from Rome; Gregory I, 590–604, after whom the Gregorian chant is named; and Pope Nicholas I, 858–867, who consolidated the Catholic Church in the Western world in the Middle Ages.

John Paul's successor, Benedict XVI, did not use the term directly in public speeches, but made oblique references to "the great Pope John Paul II" in his first address from the loggia of St. Peter's Basilica, at the 20th World Youth Day 2005 in Germany when he said in Polish: "As the great Pope John Paul II would say: Keep the flame of faith alive in your lives and your people"; and in May 2006 during a visit to Poland where he repeatedly made references to "the great John Paul" and "my great predecessor".

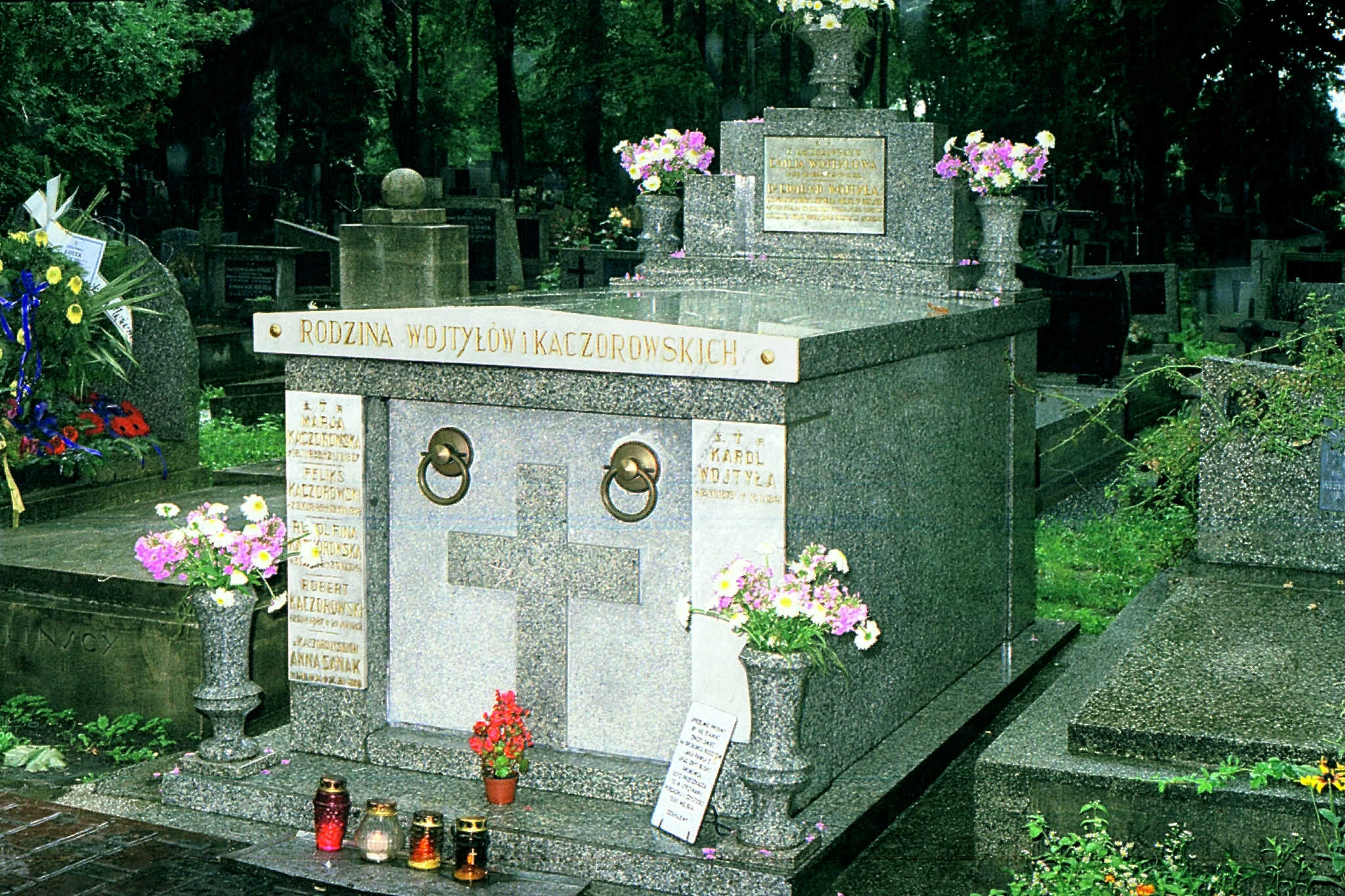
The tomb of the parents of John Paul II at Rakowicki Cemetery in Kraków, Poland

==== Institutions named after John Paul II ====
- Pope John Paul II High School (Tennessee), US
- John Paul II High School (Plano, Texas), US
- John Paul the Great Catholic University, California, US
- John Paul the Great Catholic High School (Indiana), US
- John Paul II Catholic Secondary School, London, Ontario, Canada
- John Paul II Catholic University of Lublin, Poland
- Saint John Paul the Great Catholic High School (Virginia), US
- John Paul II High School, Greymouth, New Zealand
- Karol Wojtyla College, Lima, Peru
- Scoil Eoin Phóil, Leixlip, Ireland
- John Paul II Gymnasium, Kaunas, Lithuania
- Pope John Paul II High School in Olympia, Washington, US
- Universidad Privada Juan Pablo II, Lima, Peru
- Karol Wojtyła building at Atma Jaya Catholic University of Indonesia in Jakarta, Indonesia
- St. John Paul II Chapel and Museum at Pakuwon Mall in Surabaya, Indonesia
- St. John Paul II Minor Seminary, Minor Seminary in Antipolo City, Philippines
- St. John Paul II Parish Community, Lake View, New York, US
- St. John Paul II High School (Massachusetts), US
- Saint John Paul II Academy Boca Raton, Florida, US
- St. John Paul II Catholic High School (Alabama), US
- St. John Paul II Catholic High School (Arizona), US
- St John Paul II College, Canberra, Australia
- St. John Paul II Seminary, Washington, DC, US
- Pope Saint John Paul II Major Seminary Awka, Nigeria
- St. John Paul II Catholic Secondary School, Scarborough, Ontario, Canada
- Pope John Paul II High School, Royersford Pennsylvania, US

==== Beatification ====
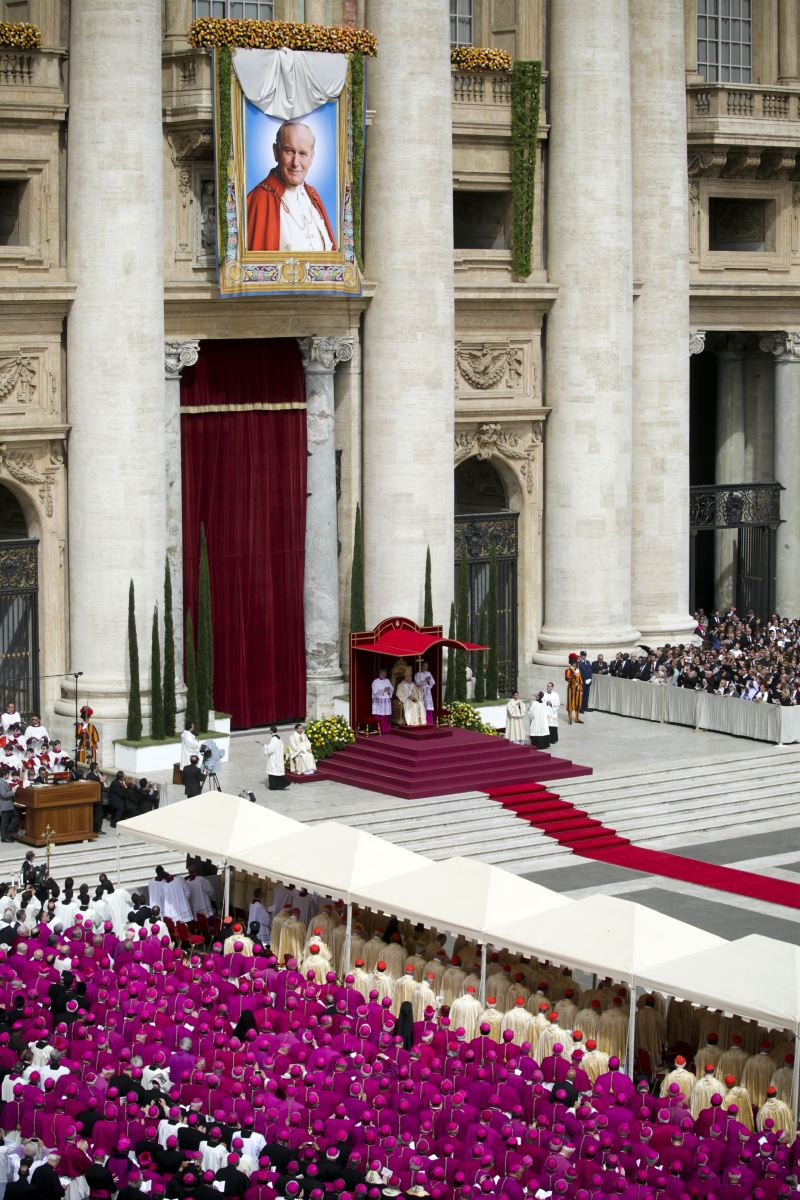
Some 1.5 million St. Peter's Square attendees witness the beatification of John Paul II on 1 May 2011 in Vatican City.

Cries of "Santo subito! Santo subito!" ("sainthood now!") were heard from the crowd during the pope's funeral and the conclave.

Pope Benedict XVI began the beatification process for his predecessor, bypassing the normal process of waiting five years after a person's death before beginning the beatification process. In an audience with Pope Benedict XVI, Camillo Ruini, Vicar General of the Diocese of Rome, who was responsible for promoting the cause for canonisation of any person who died within that diocese, cited "exceptional circumstances", which suggested that the waiting period could be waived. This decision was announced on 13 May 2005, the Feast of Our Lady of Fátima and the 24th anniversary of the assassination attempt on John Paul II at St. Peter's Square.

In early 2006, it was reported that the Vatican was investigating a possible miracle associated with John Paul II. Sister Marie Simon-Pierre, a French nun and member of the Congregation of Little Sisters of Catholic Maternity Wards, confined to her bed by Parkinson's disease, was reported to have experienced a "complete and lasting cure after members of her community prayed for the intercession of Pope John Paul II". As of May 2008, Sister Marie Simon-Pierre, then 46, was working again at a maternity hospital run by her religious institute.

"I was sick and now I am cured," she told reporter Gerry Shaw. "I am cured, but it is up to the church to say whether it was a miracle or not."

On 28 May 2006, Pope Benedict XVI celebrated Mass before an estimated 900,000 people in John Paul II's native Poland. During his homily, he encouraged prayers for the early canonisation of John Paul II and stated that he hoped canonisation would happen "in the near future".

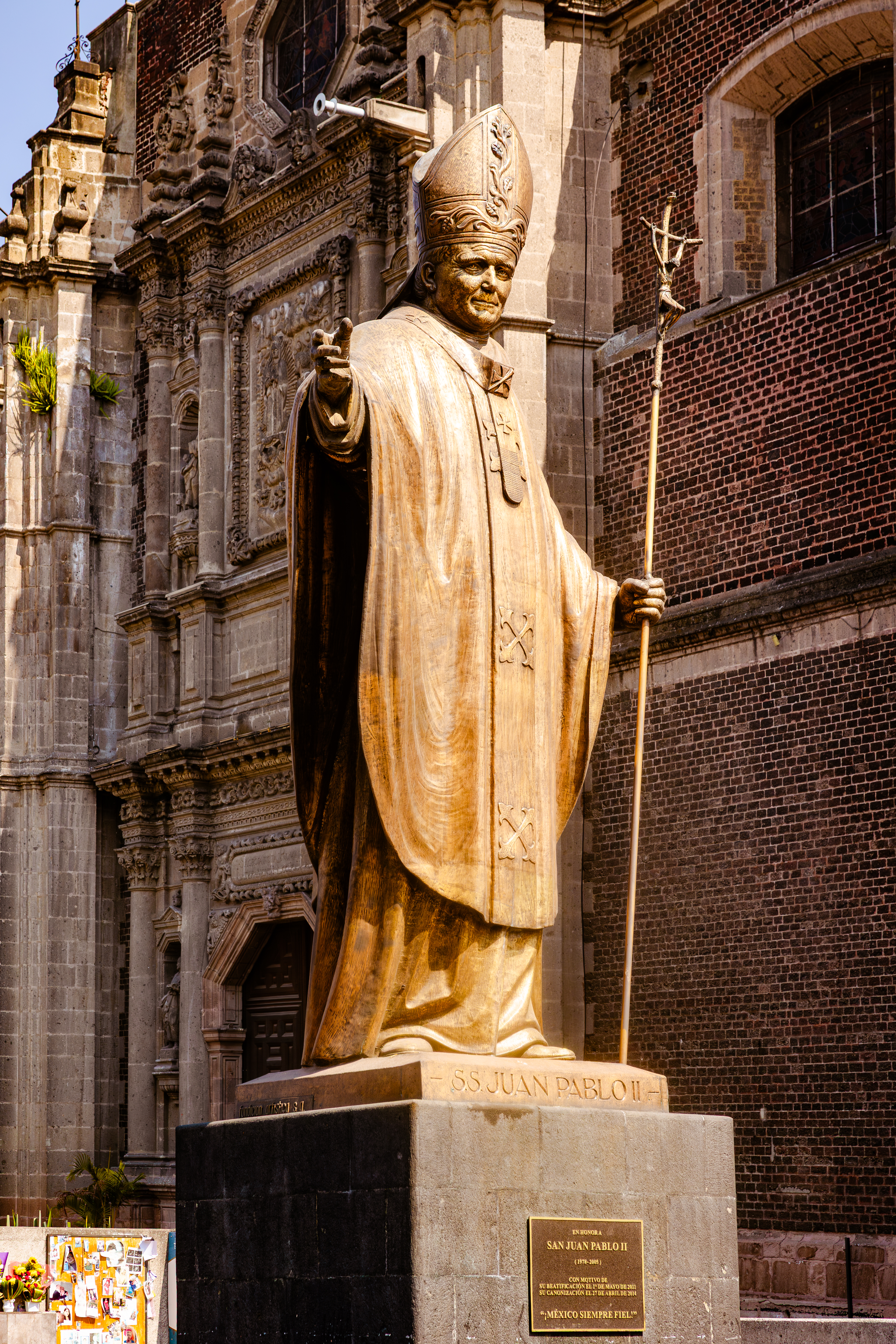
Statue of John Paul II outside the Basilica of Our Lady of Guadalupe, Tepeyac, Mexico City

In January 2007, Cardinal Stanisław Dziwisz announced that the interview phase of the beatification process, in Italy and Poland, was nearing completion. In February 2007, second class relics of John Paul II—pieces of white papal cassocks he used to wear—were freely distributed with prayer cards for the cause, a typical pious practice after a saintly Catholic's death. On 8 March 2007, the Vicariate of Rome announced that the diocesan phase of John Paul's cause for beatification was at an end. Following a ceremony on 2 April 2007—the second anniversary of the Pontiff's death—the cause proceeded to the scrutiny of the committee of lay, clerical, and episcopal members of the Vatican's Congregation for the Causes of Saints, to conduct a separate investigation. On the fourth anniversary of John Paul II's death, 2 April 2009, Cardinal Dziwisz, told reporters of a presumed miracle that had recently occurred at the former pope's tomb in St. Peter's Basilica. A nine-year-old Polish boy from Gdańsk, who was suffering from kidney cancer and was completely unable to walk, had been visiting the tomb with his parents. On leaving St. Peter's Basilica, the boy told them, "I want to walk," and began walking normally. On 16 November 2009, a panel of reviewers at the Congregation for the Causes of Saints voted unanimously that John Paul II had lived a life of heroic virtue. On 19 December 2009, Pope Benedict XVI signed the first of two decrees needed for beatification and proclaimed John Paul II "Venerable", asserting that he had lived a heroic, virtuous life. The second vote and the second signed decree certified the authenticity of the first miracle, the curing of Sister Marie Simon-Pierre, a French nun, from Parkinson's disease. Once the second decree is signed, the position (the report on the cause, with documentation about his life and writings and with information on the cause) is complete. He can then be beatified. Some speculated that he would be beatified sometime during (or soon after) the month of the 32nd anniversary of his 1978 election, in October 2010. As Monsignor Oder said, this course would have been possible if the second decree were signed in time by Benedict XVI, stating that a posthumous miracle directly attributable to his intercession had occurred, completing the positio.

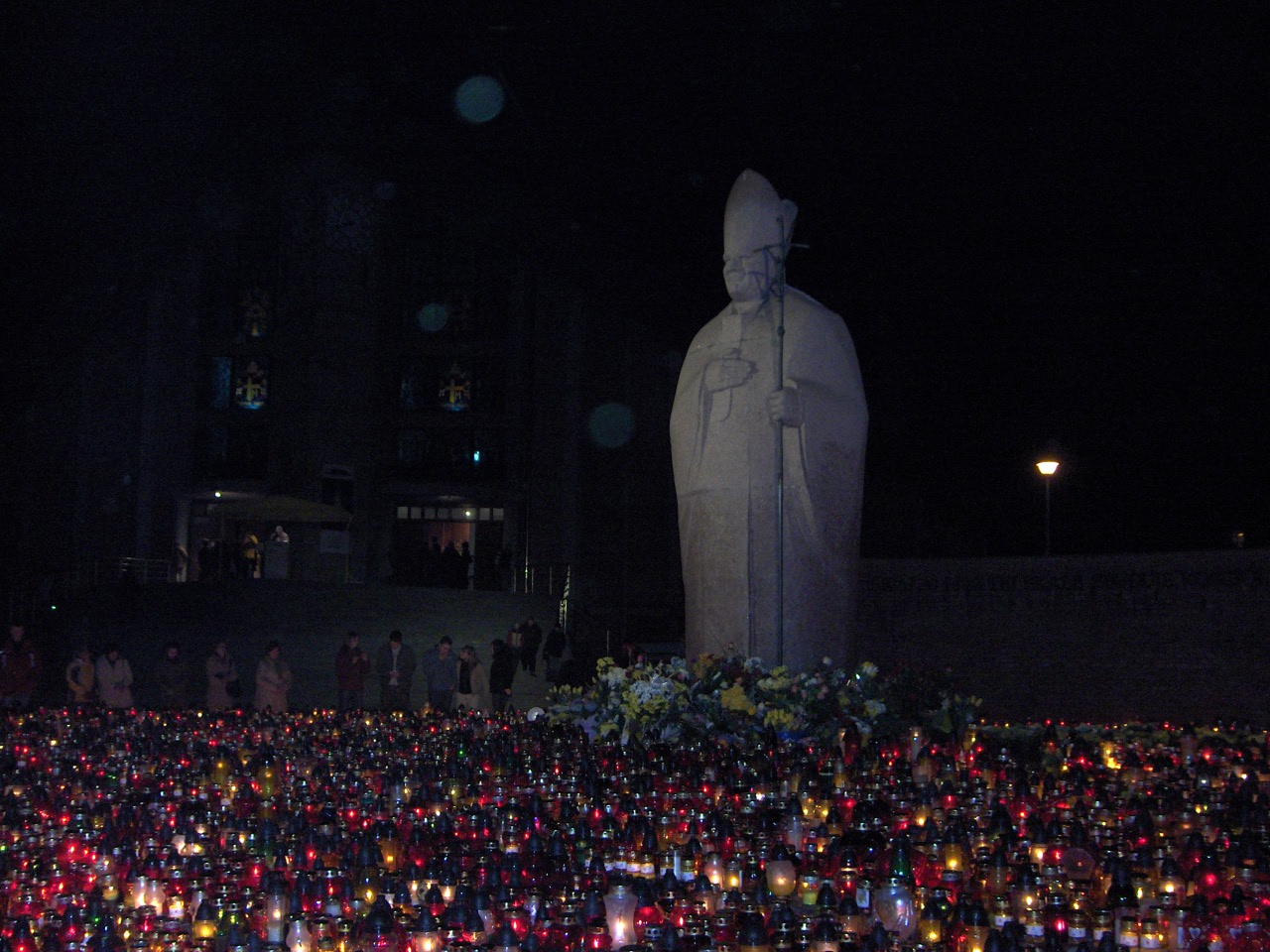
Candles around monument to John Paul II in Zaspa, Gdańsk, at the time of his death

The Vatican announced on 14 January 2011 that Pope Benedict XVI had confirmed the miracle involving Sister Marie Simon-Pierre and that John Paul II was to be beatified on 1 May, the Feast of Divine Mercy. 1 May is commemorated in former Communist countries, such as Poland, and some Western European countries as May Day, and John Paul II was well known for his contributions to Communism's relatively peaceful demise. In March 2011 the Polish mint issued a gold 1,000 Polish złoty coin (equivalent to US$350), with the Pope's image to commemorate his beatification.

On 29 April 2011, John Paul II's coffin was disinterred from the grotto beneath St. Peter's Basilica ahead of his beatification, as tens of thousands of people arrived in Rome for one of the biggest events since his funeral. John Paul II's remains, which were not exposed, were placed in front of the Basilica's main altar, where believers could pay their respect before and after the beatification Mass in St. Peter's Square on 1 May 2011. On 3 May 2011 his remains were interred in the marble altar in Pier Paolo Cristofari Chapel of St. Sebastian, where Pope Innocent XI was buried. This more prominent location, next to the Chapel of the Pietà, the Chapel of the Blessed Sacrament, and statues of Popes Pius XI and Pius XII was intended to allow more pilgrims to view his memorial. John Paul II's body is located near the bodies of Pope Pius X and Pope John XXIII, whose bodies were reinterred in the Basilica after their own beatifications and together are three of the five popes beatified in the last century. The two popes who were not exhumed and reinterred after becoming a blessed in the last century were Pope Paul VI and Pope John Paul I, who both remain entombed in the papal grottos.

In July 2012, a Colombian man, Marco Fidel Rojas, the former mayor of Huila, Colombia, testified that he was "miraculously cured" of Parkinson's disease after a trip to Rome where he met John Paul II and prayed with him. Antonio Schlesinger Piedrahita, a renowned neurologist in Colombia, certified Fidel's healing. The documentation was then sent to the Vatican office for sainthood causes.

In September 2020, Poland unveiled a sculpture of him, designed by Jerzy Kalina and installed outside the National Museum, Warsaw, holding up a meteorite above a pool of red water representing blood. In the same month, a relic containing his blood was stolen from the Spoleto Cathedral in Italy.

A small minority of Catholic theologians disagreed with the call for the beatification of John Paul II. They included Jesuit professor José María Castillo and Italian theologian Giovanni Franzoni, said that his support for the church's position against contraception and the ordination of women as well as the church scandals during his pontificate presented "facts which according to their consciences and convictions should be an obstacle to beatification". Some traditionalist Catholics opposed his beatification and canonisation for his views on liturgy and participation in prayer with enemies of the church, heretics and non-Christians.

==== Canonisation ====
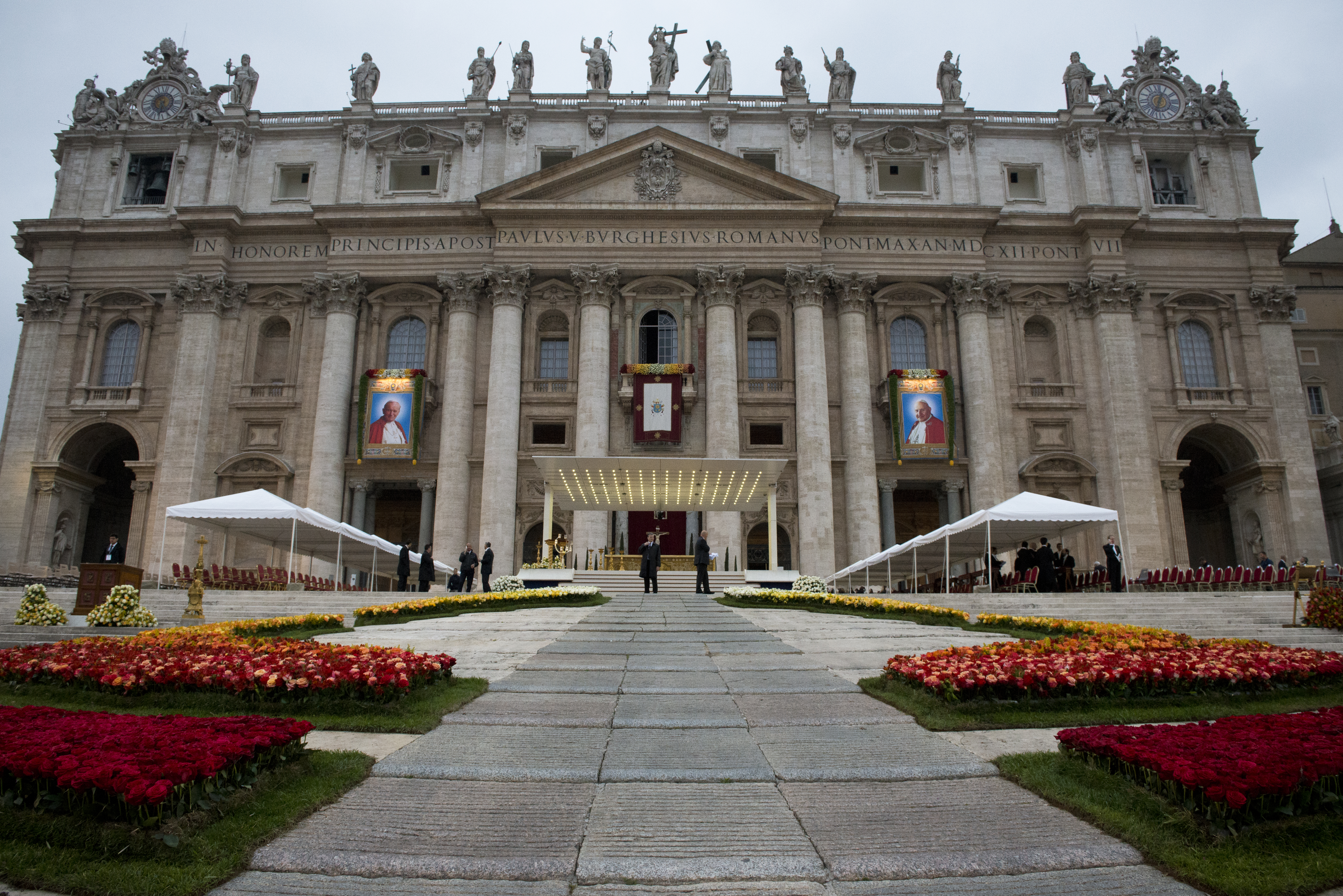
The canonisation of John Paul II and John XXIII

To be eligible for canonisation (being declared a saint) by the Catholic Church, two miracles must be attributed to a candidate.

The first miracle attributed to John Paul was the above mentioned healing of a nun's Parkinson's disease, which was recognised during the beatification process. According to an article on the Catholic News Service (CNS) dated 23 April 2013, a Vatican commission of doctors concluded that a healing had no natural (medical) explanation, which is the first requirement for a claimed miracle to be officially documented.

The second miracle was deemed to have taken place shortly after the late pope's beatification on 1 May 2011; it was reported to be the healing of Costa Rican woman Floribeth Mora of an otherwise terminal brain aneurysm. A Vatican panel of expert theologians examined the evidence, determined that it was directly attributable to the intercession of John Paul II, and recognised it as miraculous. The next stage was for Cardinals who compose the membership of the Congregation for the Causes of Saints to give their opinion to Pope Francis to decide whether to sign and promulgate the decree and set a date for canonisation.

On 4 July 2013, Pope Francis confirmed his approval of John Paul II's canonisation, formally recognising the second miracle attributed to his intercession. He was canonised together with John XXIII. The date of the canonisation was on 27 April 2014, Divine Mercy Sunday.

The canonisation Mass for Pope John Paul II and Pope John XXIII, was celebrated by Pope Francis (with Pope Emeritus Benedict XVI), on 27 April 2014 in St. Peter's Square at the Vatican (John Paul II had died on vigil of Divine Mercy Sunday in 2005). About 150 cardinals and 700 bishops concelebrated the Mass, and at least 500,000 people attended the Mass, with an estimated 300,000 others watching from video screens placed around Rome.

John Paul II's remains, considered to be holy relics, were exhumed from their place in the basilica's grotto, and a new tomb was established at the altar of St. Sebastian. His feast is celebrated annually on 22 October, the day of his papal inauguration, as the anniversary of his death usually falls during Lent and often during Holy Week.

After the 2020 report about the handling of the sexual misconduct complaints against Theodore McCarrick, some called for John Paul II's sainthood to be revoked.

==== Beatification of the Pope's parents ====
On 10 October 2019, the Archdiocese of Kraków and the Polish Episcopal Conference approved nihil obstat the opening of the beatification cause of the parents of its patron saint John Paul II, Karol Wojtyła Sr. and Emilia Kaczorowska. It gained approval from the Holy See to open the diocesan phase of the cause on 7 May 2020.

=== Banco Ambrosiano & handling of sexual abuse ===
==== Banco Ambrosiano ====
John Paul II was alleged to have links with Banco Ambrosiano, an Italian bank that collapsed in 1982. At the centre of the bank's failure was its chairman, Roberto Calvi, and his membership in the illegal Masonic Lodge Propaganda Due (aka P2). The Vatican Bank was Banco Ambrosiano's main shareholder, and the death of John Paul I in 1978 is rumoured to be linked to the Ambrosiano scandal.

Calvi, often referred to as "God's Banker", was also involved with the Vatican Bank, and was close to Bishop Paul Marcinkus, the bank's chairman. Ambrosiano also provided funds for political parties in Italy, and for both the Somoza dictatorship in Nicaragua and its Sandinista opposition. It has been widely alleged that the Vatican Bank provided money for Solidarity in Poland.

Calvi used his complex network of overseas banks and companies to move money out of Italy, to inflate share prices, and to arrange massive unsecured loans. In 1978, the Bank of Italy produced a report on Ambrosiano that predicted future disaster. On 5 June 1982, two weeks before the collapse of Banco Ambrosiano, Calvi had written a letter of warning to John Paul II, stating that such a forthcoming event would "provoke a catastrophe of unimaginable proportions in which the Church will suffer the gravest damage". On 18 June 1982 Calvi's body was found hanging from scaffolding beneath Blackfriars Bridge in the financial district of London. Calvi's clothing was stuffed with bricks, and contained cash valued at US$14,000, in three different currencies.

==== Handling of sexual abuse scandals ====
John Paul II was criticised by representatives of the victims of clergy sexual abuse for failing to respond quickly enough to the Catholic sex abuse crisis. After decades of inaction, the scandal came to a head when Sinéad O'Connor infamously tore up a photo of John Paul II on a 3 October 1992 episode of Saturday Night Live while performing an a cappella rendition of Bob Marley's "War".

In response to mounting criticism over the next decade, John Paul II stated in 2002 that "there is no place in the priesthood and religious life for those who would harm the young". The Catholic Church instituted reforms to prevent future abuse by requiring background checks for church employees and, because a significant majority of victims were boys, disallowing ordination of men with "deep-seated homosexual tendencies". They now require dioceses faced with an allegation to alert the authorities, conduct an investigation and remove the accused from duty. In 2008, the church asserted that the scandal was a very serious problem and estimated that it was "probably caused by 'no more than 1 per cent'", or 5,000, of the more than 500,000 Catholic priests worldwide.

In April 2002, John Paul II, despite being frail from Parkinson's disease, summoned all the American cardinals to the Vatican to discuss possible solutions to the issue of sexual abuse in the American Church. He asked them to "diligently investigate accusations". John Paul II suggested that American bishops be more open and transparent in dealing with such scandals and emphasised the role of seminary training to prevent sexual deviance among future priests. In what The New York Times called "unusually direct language", John Paul condemned the arrogance of priests that led to the scandals:

"Priests and candidates for the priesthood often live at a level both materially and educationally superior to that of their families and the members of their own age group. It is therefore very easy for them to succumb to the temptation of thinking of themselves as better than others. When this happens, the ideal of priestly service and self-giving dedication can fade, leaving the priest dissatisfied and disheartened."

The Pope read a statement intended for the American cardinals, calling the sex abuse "an appalling sin" and said the priesthood had no room for such men.

In 2002, Archbishop Juliusz Paetz, the Catholic Archbishop of Poznań, was accused of molesting seminarians. John Paul II accepted his resignation, and placed sanctions on him, prohibiting Paetz from exercising his ministry as bishop. It was reported that these restrictions were lifted, though Vatican spokesperson Federico Lombardi strenuously denied this, saying "his rehabilitation was without foundation".

In 2003, John Paul II reiterated that "there is no place in the priesthood and religious life for those who would harm the young". In April 2003, a three-day conference was held, titled "Abuse of Children and Young People by Catholic Priests and Religious", where eight non-Catholic psychiatric experts were invited to speak to near all Vatican dicasteries' representatives. The panel of experts overwhelmingly opposed implementation of policies of "zero-tolerance" such as was proposed by the United States Conference of Catholic Bishops. One expert called such policies a "case of overkill" since they do not permit flexibility to allow for differences among individual cases.

In 2004, John Paul II recalled Cardinal Bernard Law to be Archpriest of the Papal Basilica of Santa Maria Maggiore. Law had previously resigned as Archbishop of Boston in 2002 after Church documents revealed he had covered up sexual abuse by priests in his archdiocese. Law resigned from his Vatican position in November 2011.

John Paul II was a firm supporter of the Legion of Christ, and in 1998 discontinued investigations into sexual misconduct by its leader Marcial Maciel, who in 2005 resigned his leadership and was later requested by the Vatican to withdraw from his ministry. However, Maciel's trial began in 2004 during the pontificate of John Paul II, but the Pope died before it ended and the conclusions were known. (It has also been revealed that Vatican Secretary of State Angelo Sodano played a key role in blocking the investigations into Maciel until his removal by Benedict XVI in 2006). In an interview with L'Osservatore Romano, Pope Francis said: "I am grateful to Pope Benedict, who dared to say this publicly (when more facts began to come to light after Degollado's death in 2008, Pope Benedict XVI in 2010 launched another investigation and on 1 May 2010 announced a declaration about the crimes of the founder of the Legionaries), and to Pope John Paul II, who dared to give the green light to the Legionaries' case".

On 10 November 2020, the Vatican published a report which found that John Paul II learned of allegations of sexual impropriety against former cardinal Theodore McCarrick—at the time the Archbishop of Newark—in 1999. The pope was informed via a letter from Cardinal John O'Connor of New York, warning him that appointing McCarrick as Archbishop of Washington would be a mistake. John Paul II ordered an investigation, which stalled when three of the four bishops tasked with investigating claims allegedly brought back "inaccurate or incomplete information". John Paul II planned on not giving McCarrick the appointment anyway, but relented after McCarrick wrote a letter of denial. He created McCarrick a cardinal in 2001. McCarrick would eventually be laicized after it was shown that he abused minors. George Weigel, a biographer of John Paul II, defended the Pope's actions, saying "McCarrick fooled a lot of people ... and he deceived John Paul II in a way that is laid out in almost biblical fashion in [the Vatican's] report".

In a 2019 interview with Mexican television, Pope Francis defended John Paul II's legacy on protecting minors against clerical sexual abuse. He said that John Paul II was "often misled", as in the case of Hans Hermann Groër. Francis said that with respect to the case of Marcial Maciel:

"Ratzinger was courageous, and so was John Paul II. ... With respect to John Paul II, we have to understand certain attitudes because he came from a closed world, from behind the Iron Curtain, where communism was still in force. There was a defensive mentality. We have to understand this well, and no one can doubt the saintliness of this great man and his good will. He was great, he was great."

On 6 March 2023, an investigative report by the Polish television station TVN24 concluded that "there [is now] no doubt" that John Paul II "knew about sexual abuse of children by priests under his authority and sought to conceal it when he was an archbishop in his native Poland". The Dutch journalist Ekke Overbeek released a book on John Paul II with similar claims the following week.

In response to the claims, Pope Francis stated: "You have to put things in the context of the era[...] At that time everything was covered up. [...] It was only when the Boston scandal broke that the church began to look at the problem." The Polish Episcopal Conference stated that "'further archival research' would be needed to arrive at a just evaluation of the decisions and actions" of John Paul II. Furthermore, other journalists have criticised the report, including the sources and their interpretation. One of the sources used in the report was the controversial American archbishop Rembert Weakland, an opponent of the pontiff who himself committed sexual misconduct and covered up clerical abuse. Another point of contention is the use of materials from the communist secret police in the report.

Archives of the Archdiocese of Kraków were opened on 10 February 2026. Journalists from Rzeczpospolita conducted an analysis of the archival material pertaining to John Paul II's time as Archbishop of Kraków and concluded that there was no evidence that he covered up cases of abuse, and that some of his actions in the matter were above the standards of the time.

== Personal life ==
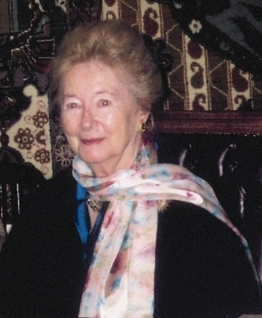
Anna-Teresa Tymieniecka maintained a thirty-year friendship with Pope John Paul II.

External videos
- Presentation by Carl Bernstein on His Holiness: John Paul II and the Hidden History of Our Time, September 24, 1996, C-SPAN

Wojtyła was a Cracovia football team supporter, and the club retired number 1 in his honour. Having played the game himself as a goalkeeper, Wojtyla was a fan of English football team Liverpool F.C., where his compatriot Jerzy Dudek played in the same position.

In 1973, while still the archbishop of Kraków, Wojtyła befriended a Polish-born, later American philosopher, Anna-Teresa Tymieniecka. The thirty-two-year friendship (and occasional academic collaboration) lasted until his death. She served as his host when he visited New England in 1976, and photos show them together on skiing and camping trips. Letters that he wrote to her were part of a collection of documents sold by Tymieniecka's estate in 2008 to the National Library of Poland. According to the BBC the library had initially kept the letters from public view, partly because of John Paul's path to sainthood, but a library official announced in February 2016 the letters would be made public. In February 2016, the BBC documentary program Panorama reported that John Paul II had apparently had a close relationship with the Polish-born philosopher. The pair exchanged personal letters over 30 years, and Stourton believes that Tymieniecka had confessed her love for Wojtyła. The Vatican described the documentary as "more smoke than fire", and Tymieniecka denied being involved with John Paul II.

Writers Carl Bernstein, the veteran investigative journalist of the Watergate scandal, and Vatican expert Marco Politi, were the first journalists to talk to Anna-Teresa Tymieniecka in the 1990s about her importance in John Paul's life. They interviewed her and dedicated 20 pages to her in their 1996 book His Holiness. Bernstein and Politi even asked her if she had ever developed any romantic relationship with John Paul II, "however one-sided it might have been". She responded, "No, I never fell in love with the cardinal. How could I fall in love with a middle-aged clergyman? Besides, I'm a married woman."

== See also ==
- Beatifications by Pope John Paul II
- Bolesław Taborski
- Cardinals created by John Paul II
- Compendium of the Social Doctrine of the Church
- Jerzy Kluger
- List of longest-reigning popes
- List of peace activists
- List of places named after Pope John Paul II
- List of popes
- List of pastoral visits of Pope John Paul II
- Museum of John Paul II and Primate Wyszynski
- Papal travel
- Peter Le Jacq

== Citations ==
=== Sources ===
- Kutleša, Dražen (2001). Ogledalo pravde [Mirror of Justice] (in Croatian). Mostar: Biskupski ordinarijat Mostar.
- Bertone, Tarcisio. "The Message of Fátima". The Holy See. Archived from the original on 21 August 2014.
- "Cause for Beatification and Canonization of The Servant of God: John Paul II". Vicariato di Roma. Archived from the original on 30 December 2009.
- "'Cured' Pope Returns to Vatican". BBC News. 10 February 2005.
- Domínguez, Juan (4 April 2005). "Pope John Paul II and Communism". religion-cults.com. Archived from the original on 6 April 2004.
- Dziwisz, Bishop Stanisław (13 May 2001). "13 May 1981 Conference of Bishop Stanisław Dziwisz For Honorary Doctorate". Catholic Culture.
- Davies, Norman (2004). Rising '44: The Battle for Warsaw. London: Viking Penguin. ISBN 978-0-670-03284-6.
- de Montfort, St. Louis-Marie Grignion (27 March 2007). True Devotion to Mary. Mark L. Jacobson (Translator). San Diego, California: Avetine Press. ISBN 978-1-59330-470-6.
- Duffy, Eamon (2006). Saints and Sinners, a History of the Popes (Third ed.). Yale University Press. ISBN 978-0-300-11597-0.
- Hebblethwaite, Peter (1995). Pope John Paul II and the Church. London: 1995 Rowman & Littlefield. ISBN 978-1-55612-814-1.
- Maxwell-Stuart, P.G. (2006) [1997]. Chronicle of the Popes: Trying to Come Full Circle. London: Thames & Hudson. ISBN 978-0-500-28608-1.
- Navarro-Valls, Joaquin (2 April 2005). Il Santo Padre è deceduto questa sera alle ore 21.37 nel Suo appartamento privato [The Holy Father passed away at 9:37 this evening in his private apartment.] (PDF) (in Italian). The Holy See.
- Pope John Paul II (2005). Memory and Identity—Personal Reflections. London: 2006 Weidenfeld & Nicolson. ISBN 978-0-297-85075-5.
- Renehan, Edward; Schlesinger, Arthur Meier (INT) (November 2006). Pope John Paul II. Chelsea House. ISBN 978-0-7910-9227-9.
- Stanley, George E (January 2007). Pope John Paul II: Young Man of the Church. Fitzgerald Books. ISBN 978-1-4242-1732-8.
- Stourton, Edward (2006). John Paul II: Man of History. London: Hodder & Stoughton. ISBN 978-0-340-90816-7.
- The Poynter Institute (1 May 2005). Pope John Paul II: 18 May 1920 - 2 April 2005 (First ed.). St. Petersburg, Florida: Andrews McMeel Publishing. ISBN 978-0-7407-5110-3.
- Weigel, George (2001b). Witness to Hope. New York: HarperCollins. ISBN 978-0-06-018793-4.
- Wojtyła, Karol (1981). Love and Responsibility. London: William Collins Sons & Co. Ltd. ISBN 978-0-89870-445-7.
- "Frail Pope Suffers Heart Failure". BBC News. 1 April 2005.
- "Half Alive: The Pope Vs. His Doctors". Time. 25 January 1982. Archived from the original on 10 February 2005.(subscription required)
- "Pope Back at Vatican by Easter? It's Possible". NBC News. Associated Press. 3 March 2005.
- "Pope Returns to Vatican after op". BBC News. 13 March 2005.
- "Stasi Files Implicate KGB in Pope Shooting". Deutsche Welle.
- "Pope John Paul II's Final Days". St Anthony Messenger Press. AmericanCatholic.org. Archived from the original on 20 November 2008.

Catholic Church titles
Preceded by Eugeniusz Baziak as Apostolic Administrator	Archbishop of Kraków; 13 January 1964 – 16 October 1978	Succeeded by Franciszek Macharski
Preceded by Francesco Bracci	Cardinal Priest of San Cesareo in Palatio; 26 June 1967 – 16 October 1978	Succeeded by Andrzej Maria Deskur
Preceded by John Paul I	Pope; 16 October 1978 – 2 April 2005	Succeeded by Benedict XVI
