= Evangelium vitae =

1995 encyclical by Pope John Paul II, on the sanctity of life

Evangelium vitae Latin for 'The Gospel of Life' Encyclical of Pope John Paul II
- Signature date: 25 March 1995
- Subject: Issues pertaining to the sanctity of human life
- Number: 11 of 14 of the pontificate
- Text: In Latin; In English

Evangelium vitae (Ecclesiastical Latin: [ɛ.vanˈd͡ʒɛː.li.um ˈvi.tɛ]) translated in English as 'The Gospel of Life', is a papal encyclical published on 25 March 1995 (on that year's Feast of the Annunciation) by Pope John Paul II. It is a comprehensive document setting out the teaching of the Catholic Church on the sanctity of human life and related issues including murder, abortion, euthanasia, and capital punishment, reaffirming the Church's stances on these issues in a way that is generally considered consistent with previous church teachings.

== Contents ==
=== Summary ===
Man is called to a fullness of life which far exceeds the dimensions of his earthly existence, because it consists in sharing the very life of God.

Evangelium vitae begins with an overview of threats to human life, both past and present, and gives a brief history of the many biblical prohibitions against killing and how this relates to the concept of a culture of life. The encyclical then addresses specific actions in light of these passages, including abortion (quoting Tertullian, who called abortion "anticipated murder to prevent someone from being born"), euthanasia (which John Paul II calls "a disturbing perversion of mercy"), and the death penalty. According to John Paul II and the magisterium the only potentially acceptable use of the death penalty is when it would not otherwise be possible to defend society, a situation which he considered rare if not non-existent in contemporary society.

The encyclical also addresses social and environmental factors, stressing the importance of a society which is built around the family rather than a wish to improve efficiency, and emphasizing the duty to care for the poor and the sick. It also deals with the proper place of sex in the relationship of marriage and the education of adolescent teenagers about relationships and sexuality.

Along with its introduction and conclusion, the letter contains four chapters:

- I. Present-day threats to human life (sections 7-28);
- II. The Christian message concerning life (sections 29–51);
- III. God's holy law (sections 52–77);
- IV. For a new culture of human life (sections 78–101).

Part I, which centres on a study of the biblical story of Cain and Abel (in Genesis chapter 4), refers to the Catholic understanding of the "roots of violence" against life (sections 7-9), a perceived "eclipse" of the value of life (10-17), a "perverse" idea of freedom of the strong over the weak (18-20), and a related "eclipse" of the sense of God and of man in human experience (21-24). It concludes with a reflection on signs of hope and an invitation to commitment (sections 25-28).

Part II begins by asking readers to fix their gaze on Christ as "the Word of life" as expressed in 1 John (sections 29-31) and views Jesus Christ as bringing life's meaning to fulfilment in the uncertainties of human life (32-33) and "God's glory [shining] on the face of man" (34-36). John Paul continues by reflecting on the "gift of eternal life" (37-28), reverence and love for every human life (39-41), and man's responsibility for life (42-43). Teaching on the dignity of the unborn child (44-45), life in old age and at times of suffering (46-47), the consistency of the Bible regarding the value of life (48-49), and the Crucifixion of Jesus (sections 50-51) is also included.

Part III, following a brief introduction to the biblical concept of commandment (52-57), affirms the Church's condemnation of abortion (58-63) and euthanasia (64-67), and discusses the roles of civil law and moral law (68-74), and the promotion of life (sections 75-76).

Part IV describes the Church as "a people of life and for life" (sections 78-79) and continues with teaching on the proclamation (80-82) and celebration (83-86) and service to carry out (87-91) the encyclical's message. Partricular attention is given to the family as the "sanctuary of life" (92-94) and bringing about a "transformation of culture" for the whole of society (sections 95-101).

In terms of historical context, John Paul II alluded to his experience of the Second World War and also to the Rerum novarum encyclical of Pope Leo XIII (1891) which sought to protect vulnerable workers.

The encyclical quoted from and complemented the Catechism of the Catholic Church (then newly published in 1992) at a time when Catholics who had previously lived under communist regimes had more freedom to learn from the Church's teachings, following the end of the Cold War.

=== Murder ===
John Paul II regretted the "progressive weakening of individual consciences and in society" around the "direct taking of all innocent human life, especially at its beginning and its end". He affirmed:

Therefore, by the authority which Christ conferred upon Peter and his Successors, and in communion with the Bishops of the Catholic Church, I confirm that the direct and voluntary killing of an innocent human being is always gravely immoral. This doctrine, based upon that unwritten law which man, in the light of reason, finds in his own heart (cf. Rom 2:14–15), is reaffirmed by Sacred Scripture, transmitted by the Tradition of the Church and taught by the ordinary and universal Magisterium.

While attempts on the life of John Paul II are not mentioned, he would have written Evangelium vitae with the knowledge of the attempted assassinations in 1981 and 1982 and the Bojinka plot discovered shortly before his visit to World Youth Day 1995 in the Philippines in January of that year.

=== Abortion ===
Among all the crimes which can be committed against life, procured abortion has characteristics making it particularly serious and deplorable. The Second Vatican Council defines abortion, together with infanticide, as an "unspeakable crime."

Evangelium vitae accepted that "the decision to have an abortion is often tragic and painful for the mother" although this can "never justify the deliberate killing of an innocent human being". The potential pressures on the pregnant woman from the father of the child, the wider family circle and friends, doctors and nurses were also acknowledged.

While John Paul II noted that the Bible's texts "never address the question of deliberate abortion and so do not directly and specifically condemn it ... they show such great respect for the human being in the mother's womb" that a logical consequence was that "You shall not kill" be extended to the unborn child as well. Christian tradition, he added, was "clear and unanimous, from the beginning up to our own day, in describing abortion as a particularly grave moral disorder. Given this "unanimity in the doctrinal and disciplinary tradition of the Church", Pope Paul VI was able to declare that this tradition regarding abortion is "unchanged and unchangeable". John Paul II stated:

Therefore, by the authority which Christ conferred upon Peter and his Successors, in communion with the Bishops – who on various occasions have condemned abortion and who in the aforementioned consultation, albeit dispersed throughout the world, have shown unanimous agreement concerning this doctrine – I declare that direct abortion, that is, abortion willed as an end or as a means, always constitutes a grave moral disorder, since it is the deliberate killing of an innocent human being. This doctrine is based upon the natural law and upon the written Word of God, is transmitted by the Church's Tradition and taught by the ordinary and universal Magisterium.

In the year of the encyclical's publication, 1,210,883 legal abortions were officially recorded in the USA and 163,638 in England and Wales. In continental Europe, however, the Catholic Church perceived progress in several conservative policies at a national law, the conscientious objection of King Baudouin to abortion law in Belgium, and the adoption of a commitment to the effect that "[everyone] has the right to life [and human] life is worthy of protection already before birth" in the new Constitution of Slovakia.

=== Miscarriage and stillbirth ===
Evangelium vitae does not directly refer to miscarriage or stillbirth but affirms that life begins at conception and therefore unborn children whose lives are lost in those ways have value to God:

...the life which parents transmit has its origins in God. We see this attested in the many biblical passages which respectfully and lovingly speak of conception, of the forming of life in the mother's womb, of giving birth and of the intimate connection between the initial moment of life and the action of God the Creator.

The encyclical refers to the 1992 Catechism which calls for human life to be "respected and protected absolutely from the moment of conception" and states that from the first moment of existence, "a human being must be recognized as having the rights of a person – among which is the inviolable right of every innocent being to life".

Catholic canon law allows for children whom the parents intended to baptize but who died before baptism (therefore included miscarried or stillborn children) to be given funeral rites.

=== Contraception and sterilization ===
John Paul II addressed the accusation that the Catholic Church was "actually promoting abortion, because she obstinately continues to teach the moral unlawfulness of contraception" – this critique also asserted that "contraception, if made safe and available to all, is the most effective remedy against abortion."

In his response, he maintained that a "contraceptive mentality" was very different from responsible parenthood; indeed, it would "strengthen this temptation [to proceed with an abortion] when an unwanted life is conceived." John Paul II also noted that a "pro-abortion culture is especially strong precisely where the Church's teaching on contraception is rejected" and suggested that, in many instances, contraceptive practices were "rooted in a hedonistic mentality unwilling to accept responsibility in matters of sexuality, and [...] imply a self-centered concept of freedom, which regards procreation as an obstacle to personal fulfilment."

Furthermore, he linked contraception, sterilization and abortion together in several references in his own critique of human population planning policies.

Contraception, sterilization and abortion are certainly part of the reason why in some cases there is a sharp decline in the birthrate. It is not difficult to be tempted to use the same methods and attacks against life also where there is a situation of "demographic explosion". The Pharaoh of old, haunted by the presence and increase of the children of Israel, submitted them to every kind of oppression and ordered that every male child born of the Hebrew women was to be killed (cf. Ex 1:7-22). Today not a few of the powerful of the earth act in the same way.

The US Government had been pursuing population control as part of its foreign policy since the 1970s, following National Security Study Memorandum 200 which was declassified in 1989.

As an alternative, John Paul II proposed that governments and international agencies should "strive to create economic, social, public health and cultural conditions which will enable married couples to make their choices about procreation in full freedom and with genuine responsibility." This, he contended, should be followed by global efforts to ensure "greater opportunities and a fairer distribution of wealth so that everyone can share equitably in the goods of creation."

=== Euthanasia ===
... in harmony with the Magisterium of my Predecessors and in communion with the Bishops of the Catholic Church, I confirm that euthanasia is a grave violation of the law of God, since it is the deliberate and morally unacceptable killing of a human person.

The discussion of euthanasia coincided with initial public and legislative debates in the Netherlands following the Remmelink Report in 1991, the Oregon Ballot Measure referendum in the USA in 1994, and legislation in the Northern Territory of Australia through the Rights of the Terminally Ill Act 1995 (repealed in 1997).

John Paul II suggested that when the prevailing tendency in society is "to value life only to the extent that it brings pleasure and well-being, suffering seems like an unbearable setback, something from which one must be freed at all costs." The secular mind therefore views death as "rightful liberation" once life is held to be no longer meaningful "because it is filled with pain and inexorably doomed to even greater suffering."

He cautioned that while euthanasia "might seem logical and humane, when looked at more closely [it] is seen to be senseless and inhumane" and associated with an "excessive preoccupation with efficiency" in modern society, which sees the growing number of elderly and disabled people as "intolerable and too burdensome." These people, he added, "are very often isolated by their families and by society".

Euthanasia ― defined as "an action or omission which of itself and by intention causes death, with the purpose of eliminating all suffering" ― was distinguished from decisions to forego medical treatment, towards the end of a life, which was "disproportionate to any expected results" or because they impose an "excessive burden on the patient and his family;" the latter, he maintained, expresses acceptance of the human condition in the face of death when this is "clearly imminent and inevitable."

Palliative care was strongly commended as part of modern medicine for making suffering more bearable in the final stages of an illness and to ensure that the patient is "supported and accompanied in his or her ordeal". He restated teaching by Pope Pius XII that it is licit to relieve pain by narcotics "even when the result is decreased consciousness and a shortening of life" where a serious reason permits this course of treatment.

John Paul II died at the age of 84 on 2 April 2005, and received palliative care in the days before his death at his residence in the Vatican City.

=== Capital punishment ===
Evangelium vitae sets the Church's perspective on capital punishment in the context of a need for the state to "render the aggressor incapable of causing harm [which] sometimes involves taking his life". Pope John Paul acknowledged a "growing tendency, both in the Church and in civil society, to demand that [the death penalty] be applied in a very limited way or even that it be abolished completely."

In a subsequent discussion of penal justice, he noted that the primary purpose of the punishment which society inflicts on an offender is "to redress the disorder caused by the offence" through "an adequate punishment for the crime, as a condition for the offender to regain the exercise of his or her freedom". This is aligned with the related purposes of the punishment i.e. to defend public order, ensure public safety, and give the offender an incentive and help to change his or her behaviour and be rehabilitated).

He concluded that, for these purposes to be achieved, the nature and extent of the punishment must be carefully evaluated and decided upon, and ought not go to the extreme of executing the offender except in cases of absolute necessity. This absolute would only exist in a situation where it would not be possible otherwise to defend society, and "as a result of steady improvements in the organization of the penal system, such cases are very rare, if not practically non-existent." John Paul II restated the underlying principle set forth in the 1992 Catechism:

If bloodless means are sufficient to defend human lives against an aggressor and to protect public order and the safety of persons, public authority must limit itself to such means, because they better correspond to the concrete conditions of the common good and are more in conformity to the dignity of the human person.

The writing and distribution of Evangelium vitae coincided with the abolition of capital punishment in several European countries after the fall of the Iron Curtain, and also in South Africa under the post-apartheid government.

== Authority ==
The teachings of Evangelium vitae on the immorality of murder, directly willed abortion, and euthanasia are considered infallible by Catholic theologians including "liberals" (Richard Gaillardetz, Hermann Pottmeyer), "moderates" (Francis A. Sullivan), and "conservatives" (Mark Lowery, Lawrence J. Welch). According to these theologians, these three teachings are not examples of papal infallibility, but are examples of the infallibility of the ordinary and universal Magisterium. In other words, Pope John Paul II was not exercising papal infallibility in this encyclical, but he was stating that these doctrines have already been taught infallibly by the bishops of the Catholic Church throughout history.

1. Before writing Evangelium vitae, Pope John Paul II surveyed every Catholic bishop in the world asking whether they agreed that murder, directly willed abortion, and euthanasia immoral, and all agreed that they were. To make this connection clear, the pope concluded each of these passages in Evangelium vitae with a reference to the "ordinary and universal magisterium" and a footnote that cited Lumen gentium, section 25.

2. William Levada, Prefect of the Congregation for the Doctrine of the Faith from May 2005 until June 2012, wrote in 1995 that Evangelium vitae's teaching regarding abortion was an infallible teaching of the ordinary magisterium.

3. The Congregation for the Doctrine of the Faith stated that these teachings in Evangelium vitae are infallible in its "Commentary on the Concluding Formula of the Professio Fidei", published on June 29, 1998, and signed by Cardinal Ratzinger and Archbishop Tarcisio Bertone.

Nonetheless, moral theologian James Bretzke, SJ, has stated that "it is unclear whether [the] formula [used in Evangelium vitae] meant to claim infallibility" and that "there is no clear consensus that any teaching in the ordinary magisterium claims infallibility." Even if not "infallible" under the teaching authority of the ordinary Magisterium, however, the teachings of Evangelium vitae are still entitled to being "received with the religious respect (obsequium religiosum) called for in [Lumen Gentium, section 25]."

While acknowledging that the expression 'Gospel of life' is not found as such in the Bible, Evangelium vitae viewed its outworkings as an increasingly "valuable and fruitful area for positive cooperation with our brothers and sisters of other Churches and ecclesial communities", and also "a providential area for dialogue and joint efforts with the followers of other religions and with all people of good will."

== See also ==
- Catholic theology of the body
- Catholicism and abortion
- Christian views on birth control
- Church authority
- Consistent life ethic
- Culture of life
- Humanae vitae
- Pro-life movements
- Religious views on euthanasia
- Teachings of Pope John Paul II
