= Political views of Pope John Paul II =

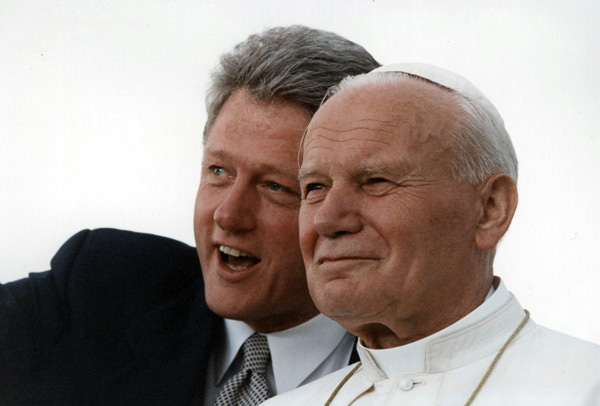
Pope John Paul II with U.S. President Bill Clinton, August 1993.

Pope John Paul II's political views were considered traditional on issues relating to reproduction and the ordination of women during his 26-year reign as pope of the Roman Catholic Church and sovereign of Vatican City. A series of 129 lectures given by John Paul during his Wednesday audiences in Rome between September 1979 and November 1984 were later compiled and published as a single work entitled ‘Theology of the Body’, an extended meditation on the nature of human sexuality. He also extended it to condemnation of abortion, euthanasia and virtually all uses of capital punishment, calling them all a part of the "culture of death" that is pervasive in the modern world, advocating instead what he understood to be a "culture of life". He campaigned for world debt forgiveness and social justice.

== Relations with dictatorships ==
In 1984 through "Instruction on Certain Aspects of the 'Theology of Liberation,'" and similar documents employing the voice of Cardinal Ratzinger, leader of the Congregation for the Doctrine of the Faith, John Paul II officially articulated his reservations about some forms of Liberation theology supplanting traditional Catholic doctrine. Liberation theology had many followers in South America. Óscar Romero's attempt, during his visit to Europe, to obtain a Vatican condemnation of El Salvador's regime, denounced for violations of human rights and its support of death squads, was a failure. In his travel to Managua, Nicaragua in 1983, John Paul II harshly condemned what he dubbed the "popular Church" (i.e. "ecclesial base communities" (CEBs) supported by the CELAM), and the Nicaraguan clergy's tendencies to support the leftist Sandinistas, reminding the clergy of their duties of obedience to the Holy See.

John Paul II was criticised for visiting Augusto Pinochet in Chile. He invited him to restore democracy, but, critics claim, not in as firm terms as the ones he used against communist regimes. John Paul also allegedly endorsed Pío Cardinal Laghi, who critics say supported the "Dirty War" in Argentina and was on friendly terms with the Argentine generals of the military dictatorship, allegedly playing regular tennis matches with general Jorge Rafael Videla. However, the Pope has been linked to the fall of Jean-Claude Duvalier's dictatorship in Haiti. He was also critical of the Chinese Communist regime and the Chinese Patriotic Catholic Association running the church and appointing bishops without the consent of the Holy See, and maintained strong ties with underground Catholic groups.

The pope, who began his papacy when the Soviet regime controlled his native country of Poland, as well as the rest of Central and Eastern Europe, was a critic of Communism, and supported the Polish Solidarity movement. Former Soviet President Mikhail Gorbachev once said the collapse of the Iron Curtain would have been impossible without John Paul II.

In later years, after having condemned Liberation theology, John Paul II criticised some of the more extreme versions of capitalism. "Unfortunately, not everything the West proposes as a theoretical vision or as a concrete lifestyle reflects Gospel values." He saw in capitalism certain "viruses": indifferentism, hedonism, secularism, consumerism, practical materialism, and also formal atheism.

=== South American and Caribbean dictatorships ===
According to Joaquín Navarro-Valls, John Paul II's press secretary:

"The single fact of John Paul II's election in 1978 changed everything. In Poland, everything began. Not in East Germany or Czechoslovakia. Then the whole thing spread. Why in 1980 did they lead the way in Gdansk? Why did they decide, now or never? Only because there was a Polish pope. He was in Chile and Pinochet was out. He was in Haiti and Duvalier was out. He was in the Philippines and Marcos was out. On many of those occasions, people would come here to the Vatican thanking the Holy Father for changing things."

==== Chile ====
Before John Paul II's pilgrimage to Latin America, during a meeting with reporters, he criticised Augusto Pinochet's regime as "dictatorial". In the words of The New York Times, he used "unusually strong language" to criticise Pinochet and asserted to journalists that the Catholic Church in Chile must not only pray, but actively fight for the restoration of democracy in Chile.

During his visit to Chile in 1987, John Paul II asked Chile's 31 Catholic bishops to campaign for free elections in the country. According to George Weigel and Cardinal Stanisław Dziwisz, he encouraged Pinochet to accept a democratic opening of the regime, and may even have called for his resignation. According to Monsignor Sławomir Oder, the postulator of John Paul II's beatification cause, John Paul's words to Pinochet had a profound impact on the Chilean dictator. The pope confided to a friend: "I received a letter from Pinochet in which he told me that as a Catholic he had listened to my words, he had accepted them, and he had decided to begin the process to change the leadership of his country."

During his visit to Chile, John Paul II supported the Vicariate of Solidarity, the church-led pro-democracy, anti-Pinochet organisation. John Paul II visited the Vicariate of Solidarity's offices, spoke with its workers, and "called upon them to continue their work, emphasizing that the Gospel consistently urges respect for human rights". While in Chile, John Paul II made gestures of public support of Chile's anti-Pinochet democratic opposition. For instance, he hugged and kissed Carmen Gloria Quintana, a young student who had been nearly burned to death by Chilean police and told her that "We must pray for peace and justice in Chile." Later, he met with several opposition groups, including those that had been declared illegal by Pinochet's government. The opposition praised John Paul II for denouncing Pinochet as a dictator, for many members of Chile's opposition were persecuted for much milder statements. Bishop Carlos Camus, one of the harshest critics of Pinochet's dictatorship within the Chilean Church, praised John Paul II's stance during the papal visit, saying: "I am quite moved, because our pastor supports us totally. Never again will anyone be able to say that we are interfering in politics when we defend human dignity." He added: "No country the Pope has visited has remained the same after his departure. The Pope's visit is a mission, an extraordinary social catechism, and his stay here will be a watershed in Chilean history."

==== Haiti ====
John Paul II visited Haiti on 9 March 1983, when the country was ruled by Jean-Claude "Baby Doc" Duvalier. He bluntly criticised the poverty of the country, directly addressing Baby Doc and his wife, Michèle Bennett in front of a large crowd of Haitians:

"Yours is a beautiful country, rich in human resources, but Christians cannot be unaware of the injustice, the excessive inequality, the degradation of the quality of life, the misery, the hunger, the fear suffered by the majority of the people."

John Paul II spoke in French and occasionally in Creole, and in the homily outlined the basic human rights that most Haitians lacked: "the opportunity to eat enough, to be cared for when ill, to find housing, to study, to overcome illiteracy, to find worthwhile and properly paid work; all that provides a truly human life for men and women, for young and old." Following John Paul II's pilgrimage, the Haitian opposition to Duvalier frequently reproduced and quoted the pope's message. Shortly before leaving Haiti, John Paul II called for social change in Haiti by saying: "Lift up your heads, be conscious of your dignity of men created in God's image...."

John Paul II's visit inspired massive protests against the Duvalier dictatorship. In response to the visit, 860 Catholic priests and church workers signed a statement committing the church to work on behalf of the poor. In 1986, Duvalier was deposed in an uprising.

==== Paraguay ====
The collapse of the dictatorship of General Alfredo Stroessner of Paraguay was linked, among other things, to John Paul II's visit to the South American country in May 1988. Since Stroessner's taking power through a coup d'état in 1954, Paraguay's bishops increasingly criticised the regime for human rights abuses, rigged elections, and the country's feudal economy. During his private meeting with Stroessner, John Paul II told the dictator:

"Politics has a fundamental ethical dimension because it is first and foremost a service to man. The Church can and must remind men—and in particular those who govern—of their ethical duties for the good of the whole of society. The Church cannot be isolated inside its temples just as men's consciences cannot be isolated from God."

Later, during a Mass, John Paul II criticised the regime for impoverishing the peasants and the unemployed, saying that the government must give people greater access to the land. Although Stroessner tried to prevent him from doing so, John Paul II met opposition leaders in the one-party state.

== Jubilee 2000 campaign ==
In 2000 he publicly endorsed the Jubilee 2000 campaign on African debt relief fronted by Irish rock stars Bob Geldof and Bono. It was reported that during this period, U2's recording sessions were repeatedly interrupted by phone calls from the Pope, wanting to discuss the campaign with Bono.

== Iraq war ==
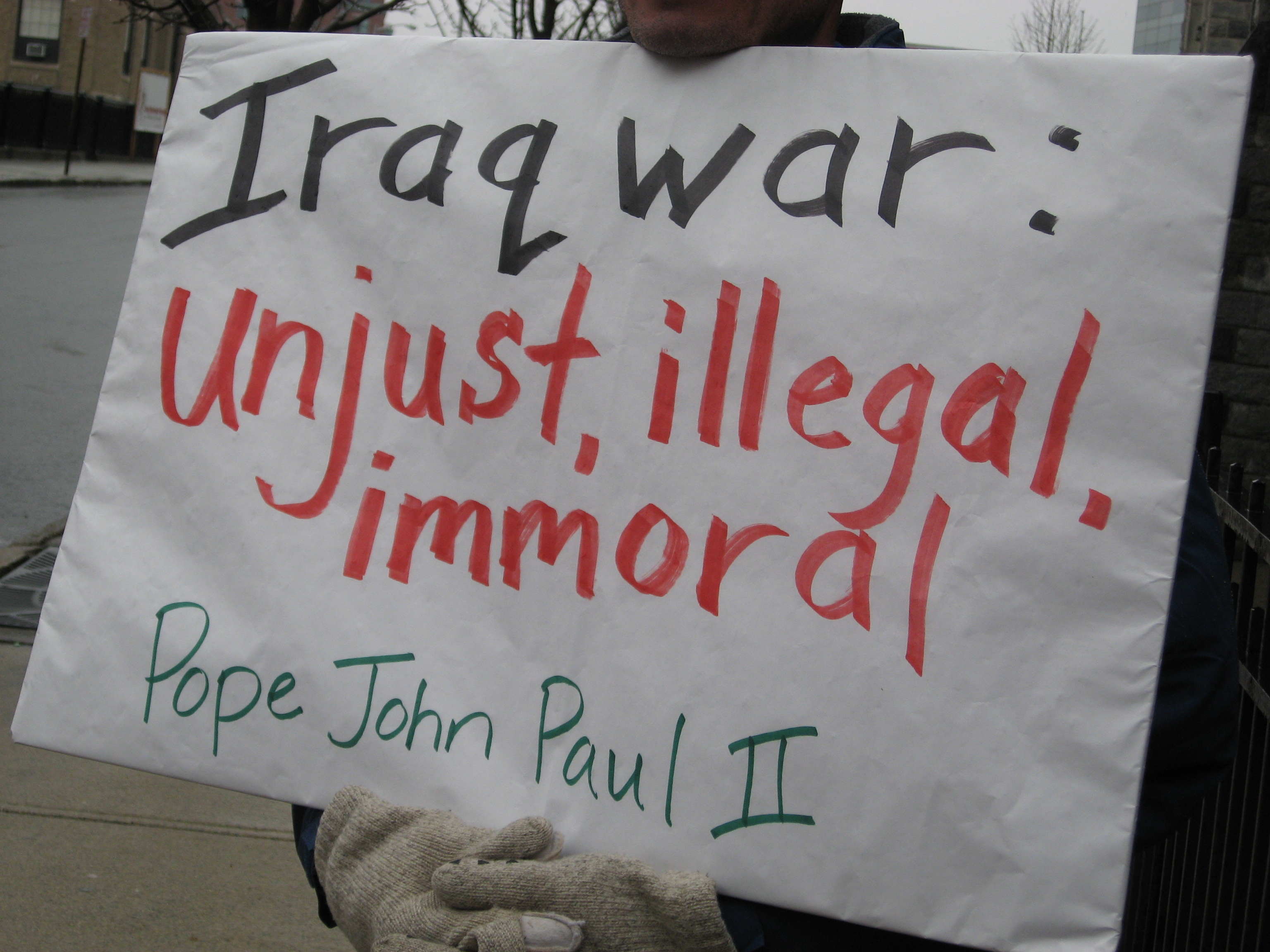
A protester holding a sign quoting Pope John Paul II, which reads "Iraq war: unjust, illegal, immoral" (March 2008)

In 2003 John Paul II also became a prominent critic of the 2003 US-led invasion of Iraq. In his 2003 State of the World address the Pope declared his opposition to the invasion by stating, "No to war! War is not always inevitable. It is always a defeat for humanity." He sent former Apostolic Pro-Nuncio to the United States Pío Cardinal Laghi to talk with American President George W. Bush to express opposition to the war. John Paul II said that it was up to the United Nations to solve the international conflict through diplomacy and that a unilateral aggression is a crime against peace and a violation of international law.

Wars generally do not resolve the problems for which they are fought and therefore... prove ultimately futile.

— Pope John Paul II,

== European Union ==
John Paul II supported the entry of his country, Poland, into the European Union.

In European Union negotiations for a new European Constitutional Treaty in 2003 and 2004, the Vatican's representatives failed to secure any mention of Europe's "Christian heritage"—one of the Pope's cherished goals.

== Sexuality ==
While taking a traditional position on sexuality, defending the Church's moral opposition to marriage for same-sex couples, the pope asserted that persons with homosexual inclinations possess the same inherent dignity and rights as everybody else. In his last book, Memory and Identity, he referred to the "pressures" on the European Parliament to permit "homosexual 'marriage'". In the book, as quoted by Reuters, he wrote: “It is legitimate and necessary to ask oneself if this is not perhaps part of a new ideology of evil, perhaps more insidious and hidden, which attempts to pit human rights against the family and against man.”

== Scientific theories and the interpretation of Genesis ==
In an address on 22 October 1996, to the Pontifical Academy of Sciences, Pope John Paul II reaffirmed the Church's openness to the theory of evolution:

In his encyclical Humani Generis (1950), my predecessor Pius XII has already affirmed that there is no conflict between evolution and the doctrine of the faith regarding man and his vocation, provided that we do not lose sight of certain fixed points....Today, more than a half-century after the appearance of that encyclical, some new findings lead us toward the recognition of evolution as more than an hypothesis. In fact it is remarkable that this theory has had progressively greater influence on the spirit of researchers, following a series of discoveries in different scholarly disciplines. The convergence in the results of these independent studies – which was neither planned nor sought – constitutes in itself a significant argument in favour of the theory.

— John Paul II, Message to the Pontifical Academy of Sciences on Evolution

In the same address, the Pope rejected any theory of evolution that provides a materialistic explanation for the human soul:

Theories of evolution which, because of the philosophies which inspire them, regard the spirit either as emerging from the forces of living matter, or as a simple epiphenomenon of that matter, are incompatible with the truth about man

— John Paul II, Message to Pontifical Academy of Sciences, 22 October 1996

John Paul II also wrote to the Pontifical Academy of Sciences on the subject of cosmology and how to interpret Genesis:

Cosmogony and cosmology have always aroused great interest among peoples and religions. The Bible itself speaks to us of the origin of the universe and its make-up, not in order to provide us with a scientific treatise, but in order to state the correct relationships of man with God and with the universe. Sacred Scripture wishes simply to declare that the world was created by God, and in order to teach this truth it expresses itself in the terms of the cosmology in use at the time of the writer. The Sacred Book likewise wishes to tell men that the world was not created as the seat of the gods, as was taught by other cosmogonies and cosmologies, but was rather created for the service of man and the glory of God. Any other teaching about the origin and make-up of the universe is alien to the intentions of the Bible, which does not wish to teach how heaven was made but how one goes to heaven.

— Pope John Paul II, 3 October 1981 to the Pontifical Academy of Science, "Cosmology and Fundamental Physics"
