= Teachings of Pope John Paul II =

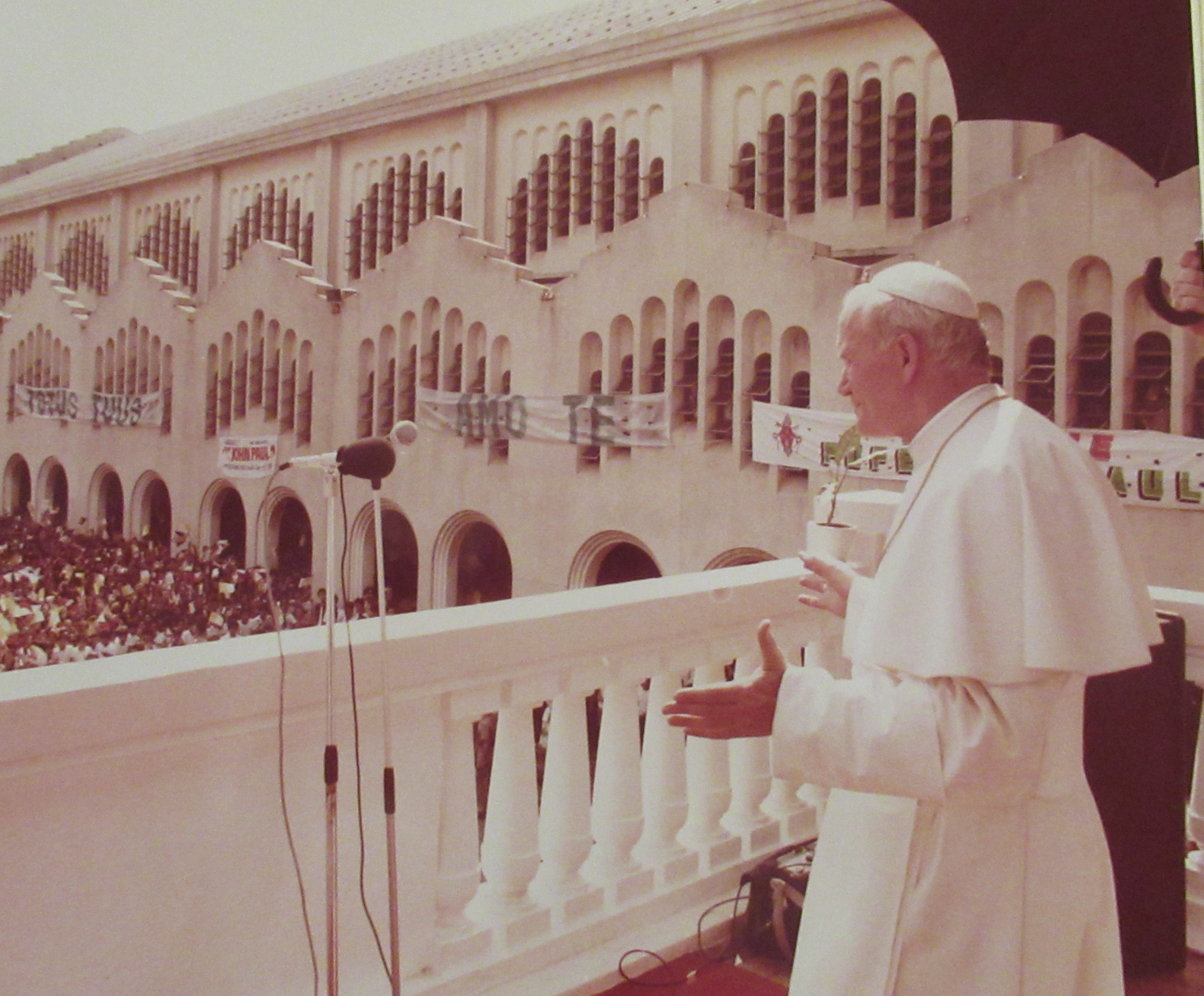
Pope John Paul II in 1981

The teachings of Pope John Paul II are contained in a number of documents. It has been said that these teachings will have a long-lasting influence on the Church.

Pope John Paul II's philosophical and theological teachings and writings were characterised by explorations in phenomenology and personalism. He was influenced by Hans Urs von Balthasar, Henri de Lubac, Yves Congar, Karl Rahner, his predecessors as Archbishop of Kraków Eugeniusz Baziak and Adam Stefan Sapieha, and his predecessors as pope – John XXIII, Paul VI, and John Paul I. His closest theological adviser was Cardinal Ratzinger, who succeeded him as pope. Stanislaw Dziwisz was his personal secretary for forty years and one of his closest friends and advisers, and became Archbishop of Kraków, John Paul's former post, and Cardinal. John Paul met regularly with the cardinal prefects and presidents of curial congregations and councils, and outlived many of them.

== Catechism of the Catholic Church ==
John Paul II published the Catechism of the Catholic Church, which became an international best-seller. Its purpose, according to the Pope's apostolic constitution Fidei Depositum was to be "a statement of the Church's faith and of Catholic doctrine, attested to or illumined by Sacred Scripture, the Apostolic Tradition and the Church's Magisterium." He declared "it to be a sure norm for teaching the faith" to "serve the renewal" of the Church.

== Holiness and morality ==
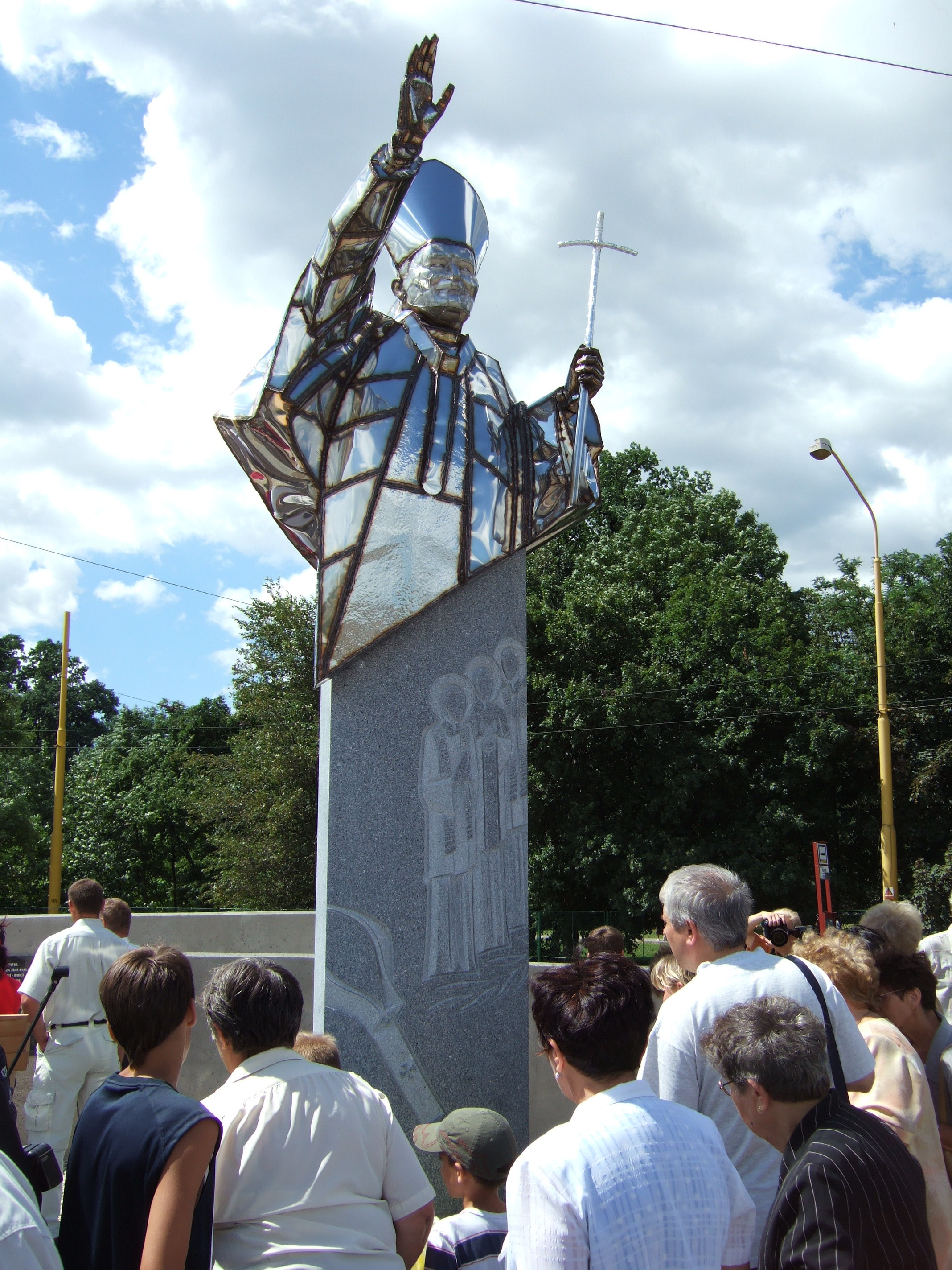
John Paul II's statue in Košice, Slovakia. The statue was unveiled by Cardinal Stanisław Dziwisz, who had been Pope John Paul II's private secretary.

Right after being elected as pope, he told the cardinals who elected him that he saw that his main work was to implement the teachings of the Second Vatican Council, an important centrepiece of which is a universal call to holiness. This is the basis for his canonization of saints from all walks of life, as well as for establishing and supporting the personal prelature of Opus Dei, that teaches that everyone is called to holiness and that ordinary life is a path to sanctity.

His first encyclical letters focused on the Triune God; the very first was on Jesus the Redeemer ("Redemptor hominis"). He maintained this intellectual focus on God throughout his pontificate.

In The Splendor of Truth ("Veritatis Splendor"), a papal encyclical concerning morality, he emphasised the dependence of man on God and his law ("Without the Creator, the creature disappears") and the "dependence of freedom on the truth." He said that man "giving himself over to relativism and scepticism, goes off in search of an illusory freedom apart from truth itself."

== Master plan for the new millennium ==
In his master plan for the new millennium, the apostolic letter At the beginning of the third millennium, ("Novo Millennio Ineunte") a "program for all times", he emphasised the importance of "starting afresh from Christ": "No, we shall not be saved by a formula but by a Person." Thus, the first priority for the Church is holiness: "All Christian faithful...are called to the fullness of the Christian life." Christians, he writes, contradict this when they "settle for a life of mediocrity, marked by a minimalist ethic and a shallow religiosity." He highlighted "the radical message of the gospels", whose demands should not be watered down. The "training in holiness calls for a Christian life distinguished above all in the art of prayer."

His final encyclical reflected on the Holy Eucharist, which he says "contains the Church's entire spiritual wealth: Christ himself". Building on his master plan further, he emphasised the need to "rekindle amazement" on the Eucharist and to "contemplate the face of Christ".

== Mariology ==
Coat of arms of Pope John Paul II. The letter M in the Marian Cross is for Mary, Jesus' mother.

John Paul II's strong Marian devotion was highly influenced by the Mariology of Saint Louis de Montfort. According to his apostolic letter Rosarium Virginis Mariae, the pontif's personal motto "Totus Tuus" was inspired by St. Louis' doctrine on total consecration to the Virgin Mary, which he quoted:

"Our entire perfection consists in being conformed, united and consecrated to Jesus Christ. Hence the most perfect of all devotions is undoubtedly that which conforms, unites and consecrates us most perfectly to Jesus Christ.

Now, since Mary is of all creatures the one most conformed to Jesus Christ, it follows that among all devotions that which most consecrates and conforms a soul to our Lord is devotion to Mary, his Holy Mother, and that the more a soul is consecrated to her the more will it be consecrated to Jesus Christ."

In an address to the Montfortian Fathers, the pontiff also said that his reading Saint Louis de Montfort's work The True Devotion to Mary was a "decisive turning point" in his life. On September 19, 1996, Pope John-Paul II made a papal trip to Saint-Laurent-sur-Sèvre to meditate and pray on the adjacent tombs of Saint Louis de Montfort and Blessed Marie Louise Trichet, whom he beatified himself.

His encyclical Redemptoris Mater further emphasizes his focus on Mariology.

== Social and family doctrine ==
John Paul II also wrote extensively about workers and the social doctrine of the Church, which he discussed in three encyclicals and which the Vatican brought to the fore through the recently published Compendium of the Social Doctrine of the Church. Pope Leo XIV asserts that in John Paul II's work, "the Church's preferential relationship with the poor was consolidated, particularly from a doctrinal standpoint". Through his encyclicals, John Paul also talked about the dignity of women and the importance of the family for the future of humanity.

Other important documents include the encyclicals The Gospel of Life ("Evangelium Vitae") and Faith and Reason ("Fides et Ratio"), and the apostolic letter "Light of the East" (Orientale Lumen).

John Paul II reaffirmed the Church's clear opposition to contraception, abortion and homosexual activity. His book Memory and Identity said that the push for same-sex marriage might be part of a "new ideology of evil... which attempts to pit human rights against the family and against man". He refined some of these positions in their theological context in his Theology of the Body lectures.

John Paul II, who was present and very influential at the 1962–65 Second Vatican Council, affirmed the teachings of the council and did much to implement them. John Paul II continued to declare that contraception, abortion, and homosexual acts were gravely sinful, and, with Joseph Ratzinger (future Pope Benedict XVI), opposed Liberation theology.

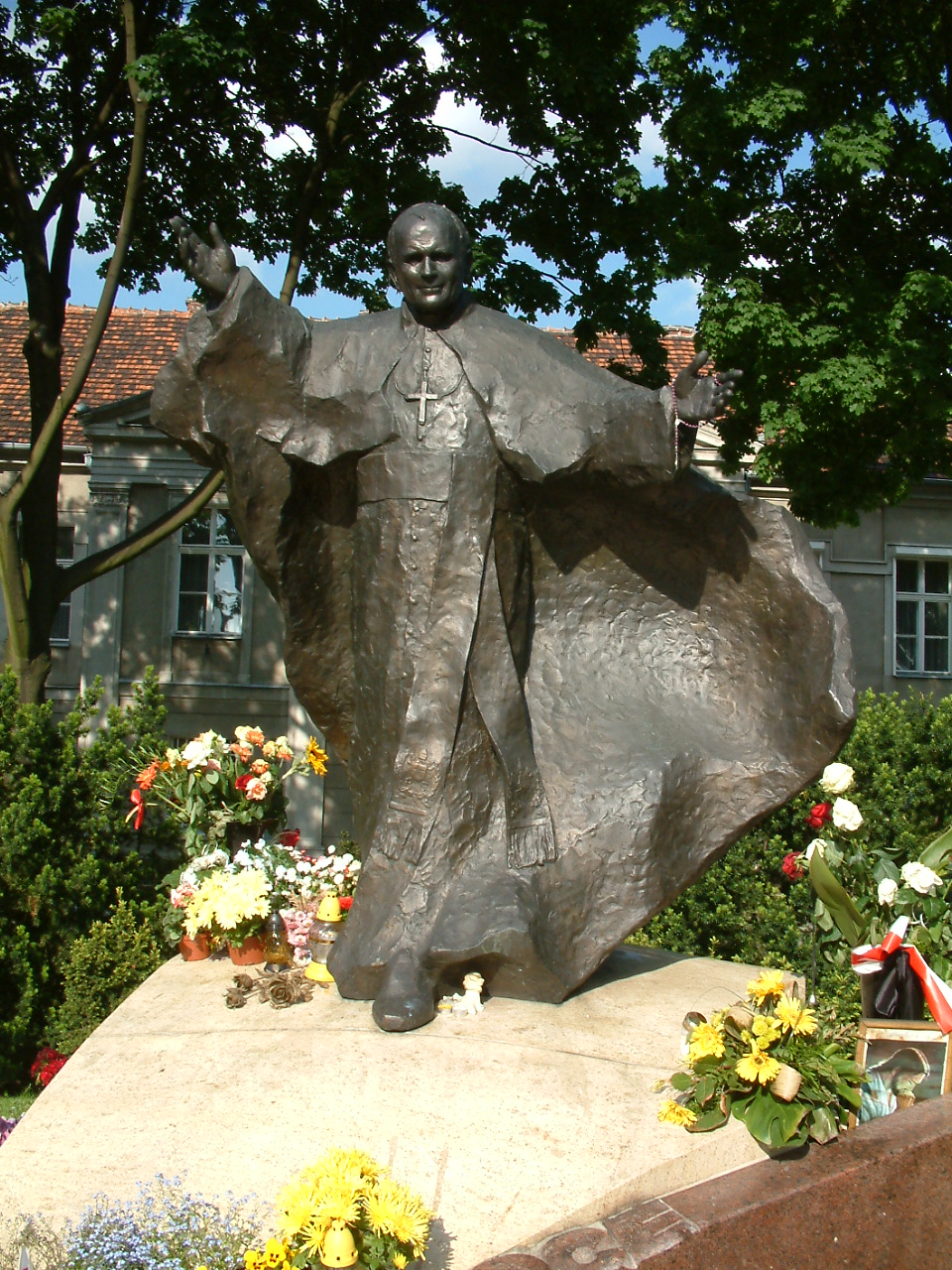
Monument to Pope John Paul II in Poznań

He believed in the Church's exaltation of the marital act of sexual intercourse between a baptised man and woman within sacramental marriage as proper and exclusive to the sacrament of marriage that was, in every instance, profaned by contraception, abortion, divorce followed by a further marriage, and by homosexual acts. He explained and asserted in 1994 the Church's lack of authority to ordain women to the priesthood. This was deemed a repudiation of calls to ordain women to the priesthood (apostolic letter 'Ordinatio Sacerdotalis'). In addition, John Paul II did not end the discipline of mandatory priestly celibacy, although he allowed a few married clergymen of other Christian traditions who later became Catholic to be ordained as Catholic priests.

John Paul II, as a writer of philosophical and theological thought, was characterized by his explorations in phenomenology and personalism. He is also known for his development of the "Theology of the Body".

== Impact ==
Philosophers and theologians influenced by John Paul II include his successor, Pope Benedict XVI, Jürgen Habermas, John Haas, Andrew Greeley, Rocco Buttiglione, Hans Köchler, George Weigel, Scott Hahn, Mary Beth Bonacci, Deirdre McQuade, Antoinette Bosco, Hans Küng, Yves Congar, Avery Dulles, John J. Myers, Raymond Leo Burke, Joseph Bernardin, Francis George, Timothy Dolan, Edward Egan, John O'Connor, Fabian Bruskewitz, Christoph Schönborn, Stanisław Dziwisz, Franciszek Macharski, Józef Glemp, Peter Hans Kolvenbach, Paolo Dezza, Pedro Arrupe, Óscar Romero, Mother Teresa, Walter Kasper, Michael Fitzgerald, Jean-Marie Lustiger, André Vingt-Trois, Jarosław Gowin, Christopher West and Elio Sgreccia.

== See also ==
- List of Encyclicals of Pope John Paul II
- Catholic Church and AIDS#Pope John Paul II
- Bibliography of Pope John Paul II
- Divine Mercy (Catholic devotion)
