= Culture of life =

Catholic moral concept popularized in the 1990s

A culture of life is a concept in Catholic moral theology that emphasizes the dignity and protection of human life, particularly life regarded as vulnerable or threatened. In Catholic teaching, it is associated with protecting life from conception to natural death and with opposition to practices including abortion, euthanasia, capital punishment, human cloning, and embryonic stem cell and fetal research. It also encompasses positive duties such as charity and care for others.

The expression was popularized by Pope John Paul II in the 1990s. He used it in his 1991 encyclical Centesimus annus and developed it more fully in the 1995 encyclical Evangelium vitae, in which he contrasted a "culture of life" with what he termed a "culture of death". In this framework, John Paul II connected respect for human life with Catholic teaching that every person is created in the image and likeness of God and should be valued as a person rather than for what they possess, do, or produce.

The phrase has also been adopted by evangelical Christians and used in United States politics. During the 2000 presidential campaign, George W. Bush invoked a "culture of life" while discussing abortion and other issues, and the Republican Party included a plank titled "Promoting a Culture of Life" in its 2004 platform. The expression has also been used in debates concerning the Terri Schiavo case and the death penalty.

== Catholic Church ==
Issues included in a Culture of Life
Promotion of	Opposition to
Agape love and charity	Abortion
	Unjust wars
	Capital punishment
	Murder and suicide
Motherhood, fatherhood, Matrimony, chastity, fidelity Virtue	Contraception Human sterilization
Organ donation	Euthanasia
	Human cloning
Adult stem cell research	Embryonic stem cell and fetal research

The expression "culture of life" entered popular parlance from Pope John Paul II in the 1990s. He used the term in his 1991 encyclical Centesimus annus, and then more fully expanded upon it in the 1995 encyclical Evangelium vitae ("Gospel of Life"):

In our present social context, marked by a dramatic struggle between the "culture of life" and the "culture of death", there is need to develop a deep critical sense, capable of discerning true values and authentic needs.

In the encyclical, the pope noted that even those who were not Catholic "can appreciate the intrinsic value of human life." He also issued "a pressing appeal addressed to each and every person, in the name of God: Respect, protect, love, and serve life, every human life! Only in this direction will you find justice, development, true freedom, peace and happiness!"

John Paul linked this to Catholic teaching, which believes every person is created in the image and likeness of God and is intimately loved by God. The Church, then, must build a culture of life that values each person as a person, not for what they own, do, or produce. It must also protect every human life, especially those that are threatened or weak. The doctrine had foundations in earlier church teaching such as Pope Paul VI's 1968 encyclical Humanae vitae, which articulated the Church's position defending life from conception to natural death, disapproving medical procedures harming an unborn fetus, which the Church holds to be a person with an inviolable right to life. Catholic hospitals and medical institutions will not perform such procedures.

Following the promulgation of Evangelium vitae, advocates of a culture of life founded the Culture of Life Foundation in the United States to promote the concepts behind the Pope's encyclical. Pope John Paul II recognized and blessed the foundation in 1997.

== United States politics ==
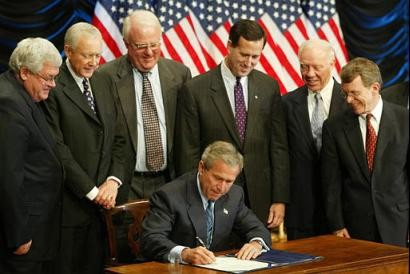
George W. Bush signing the Partial-Birth Abortion Ban Act of 2003, surrounded by members of Congress

Evangelium vitae has been described as the Catholic academic Christopher Kaczor as the "magna carta for the pro-life movement." Evangelicals and others have also adopted the phrase.

=== Abortion ===
On October 3, during the 2000 U.S. presidential election campaign, then-Texas Governor George W. Bush, a Methodist, cited the term during a televised debate against then Vice President Al Gore. Bush expressed concerns that Mifepristone, then newly approved as an abortifacient pill, would encourage more women to terminate their pregnancies; whereas his goal was to make such terminations rarer:

Surely this nation can come together to promote the value of life. Surely we can fight off these laws that will encourage doctors or allow doctors to take the lives of our seniors. Sure, we can work together to create a culture of life so some of these youngsters who feel like they can take a neighbor's life with a gun will understand that that's not the way America is meant to be.

Leonard Mary of The Boston Globe said that Bush had directly borrowed his language from John Paul II, viewing this as a deliberate strategic attempt to gain political support from "moderate" Catholics voters (while not coming out so strongly against abortion rights that it would alienate pro-choice voters). Some voters believed that only the Republican Party would build a culture of life in the United States, and this helped Bush win. Some Catholics, criticized Bush for apparent inconsistency between his support of a culture of life and his strong support for the death penalty, which Catholic doctrine permits where there is no other means for society to protect itself. As Governor of Texas, Bush repeatedly authorized executions of convicted murderers.

Kristen Day, the executive director of Democrats for Life of America, says that "achieving a culture of life cannot be done by simply voting Republican." Day says that "to be truly pro-life, we must support a broad spectrum of issues including worker's compensation, minimum wage, and education assistance for displaced workers", as well as addressing poverty, including a livable wage and health care. Day says that Republicans should broaden their definition of a culture of life beyond simple opposition to abortion, and that to achieve a true culture of life that members of both parties will be needed.

The 2004 Republican National Convention adopted a platform with a plank titled "Promoting a Culture of Life." The platform's anti-abortion stance included positions on abortion; access to healthcare despite disability, age, or infirmity; euthanasia; assisted suicide; and promoted research and resources to alleviate the pain of the terminally ill.

=== Other issues ===
The phrase "culture of life" was also invoked during the Terri Schiavo case of March 2005 when the phrase was used in support of legislative and legal efforts to prolong the life of a woman in a persistent vegetative state. It has also been used to promote providing inexpensive medical care for people in impoverished countries.

Following the Boston Marathon bombing, the Catholic bishops of Massachusetts opposed the death penalty for terrorist bomber Dzhokhar Tsarnaev, citing the need to build a culture of life. In their statement, they cited a 2005 document by the United States Conference of Catholic Bishops, A Culture of Life and the Penalty of Death, which said "no matter how heinous the crime, if society can protect itself without ending a human life, it should do so."

A growing culture of life in the United States, one that took the protection of life more seriously, led to the rapid adoption of infant safe-haven laws in the early 2000s. Under these laws, mothers can leave their newborn children in places such as hospitals, police stations and fire stations, without being criminally charged with child abandonment.

== Culture of death ==
Pope John Paul II also used the opposing term "culture of death" in Evangelium vitae (April 1995):

In fact, while the climate of widespread moral uncertainty can in some way be explained by the multiplicity and gravity of today's social problems, and these can sometimes mitigate the subjective responsibility of individuals, it is no less true that we are confronted by an even larger reality, which can be described as a veritable structure of sin. This reality is characterized by the emergence of a culture which denies solidarity and in many cases takes the form of a veritable "culture of death". This culture is actively fostered by powerful cultural, economic and political currents which encourage an idea of society excessively concerned with efficiency.

He argued that there was "a war of the powerful against the weak: a life which would require greater acceptance, love and care is considered useless, or held to be an intolerable burden, and is therefore rejected in one way or another." Those who are ill, handicapped, or just simply threaten the well being or lifestyle of the more powerful thus become enemies to be eliminated. John Paul said he saw this as applying both between individuals and between peoples and states.

He added his belief that every time an "innocent life" is taken (dating back to the time of Cain and Abel) that it was "a violation of the ‘spiritual’ kinship uniting mankind in one great family, in which all share the same fundamental good: equal personal dignity." Any threat to the human person, including wars, class conflict, civil unrest, ecological recklessness, and sexual irresponsibility, should therefore be regarded in his opinion as part of the "culture of death."

Without morals, Cardinal Cormac Murphy-O'Connor said, "it is the strong who decide the fate of the weak," and "human beings therefore become instruments of other human beings... We are already on that road: for what else is the termination of millions of lives in the womb since the Abortion Act was introduced, and embryo selection on the basis of gender and genes?"

=== Wider usage ===
Advocates of a culture of life argue that a culture of death results in political, economic, or eugenic murder. They point to historical events like the USSR's Great Purges, the Nazi Holocaust, China's Great Leap Forward and Pol Pot's Khmer Rouge as examples of devaluation of human life taken to an extreme conclusion. The term is used by those in the consistent life ethic movement to refer to supporters of embryonic stem cell research, legalized abortion, and euthanasia. Some in the anti-abortion movement, such as those from the Center for Bio-Ethical Reform, have compared those in the abortion-rights movement to the perpetrators of the Nazi Holocaust. They say that their opponents share the same disregard for human life.

== See also ==
- Anti-gender movement
- Catholic theology on the body
- Consistent life ethic
- Family values
- Sanctity of life
- Affirmation of life – Concept in Friedrich Nietzsche's philosophy
- Reverence for Life – Concept in Albert Schweitzer's ethical philosophy

== Bibliography ==
- Pope Paul VI (July 25, 1968). "Humanae vitae".
- Pope John Paul II (March 25, 1995). "Evangelium vitae".
- Day, Kristen (2006). "Politics and the Culture of Life – Why I am Still a Democrat". Notre Dame Journal of Law, Ethics, and Public Policy. 20: 383–399.
