= Plagal =

Plagal may refer to:

- Plagal cadence (in music)
- Plagal mode (in music)
- Pro-Life Alliance of Gays and Lesbians (PLAGAL)
