= Destiny Herndon-De La Rosa =

American activist (born 1983)

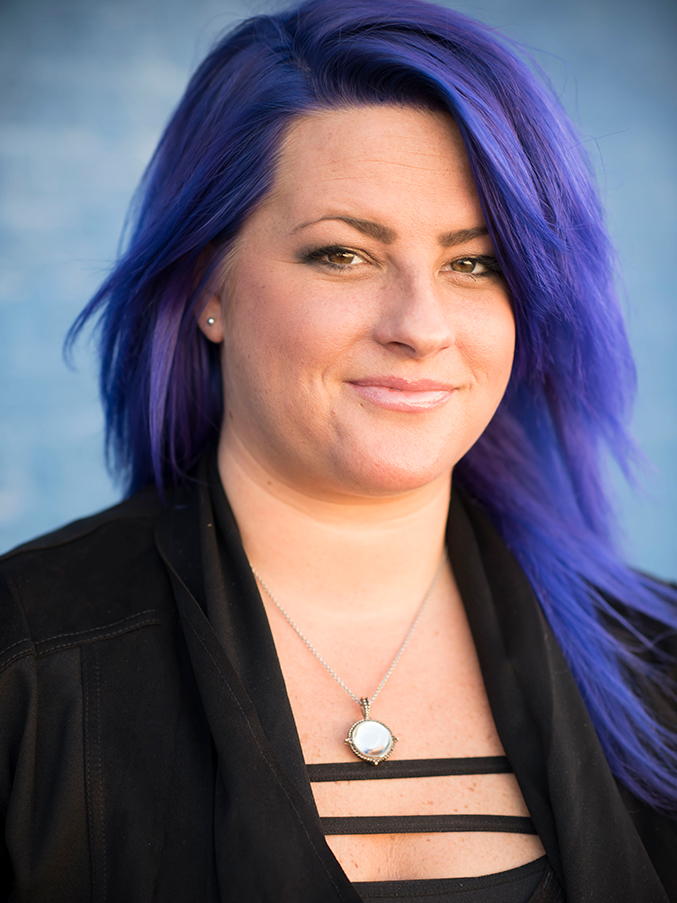
- Herndon-De La Rosa in 2017
- Born: August 10, 1983; Austin, Texas, U.S.
- Known for: Advocacy of consistent life ethic and feminism
- Political party: Independent

Destiny Herndon-De La Rosa (born August 10, 1983) is an American consistent life ethic activist. She is the founder of the organization New Wave Feminists. She is also a frequent op-ed contributor for The Dallas Morning News.

== Personal life ==
Destiny Herndon-De La Rosa was born on August 10, 1983, to a nineteen-year-old sophomore at the University of Texas at Austin. She never knew her biological father. At age 16, she became pregnant and rejected abortion in favor of raising the child herself. Now married, she has four children. Although she formerly worked in architecture, she now runs her group, New Wave Feminists, full-time.

In 2017, it was reported that Herndon-De La Rosa had switched her party affiliation from Republican to independent, having previously been involved with local Republican organizations such as the Golden Corridor Republican Women.

Herndon-De La Rosa endorsed Democrat incumbent Beto O'Rourke for re-election as U.S. representative for Texas's 16th congressional district in 2018, via an op-ed in the Dallas Morning News. She said:

I started to see, as an independent, just how deep the GOP had its hooks in the pro-life movement. I saw the way these politicians used unborn children's lives to get out the vote but then oftentimes forgot about those lives soon after. I saw the way pro-lifers compromised so many of their own upstanding ethics and morals to elect a man thrice married, who bragged about his infidelities and predatory behavior. And why? So they could get their Supreme Court seats.

In a public Facebook posting in November 2021, while discussing a scandal involving the infidelity and financial impropriety of Texas anti-abortion figures Kari Beckman and Jim Graham, Herndon De La Rosa said she had been unfaithful in her own marriage in the past, going on to say she generally does not speak about it publicly out of "respect for her husband". She indicated that they have moved on from her affair, and expressed that she is "incredibly fortunate" that her marriage survived.

== New Wave Feminists ==
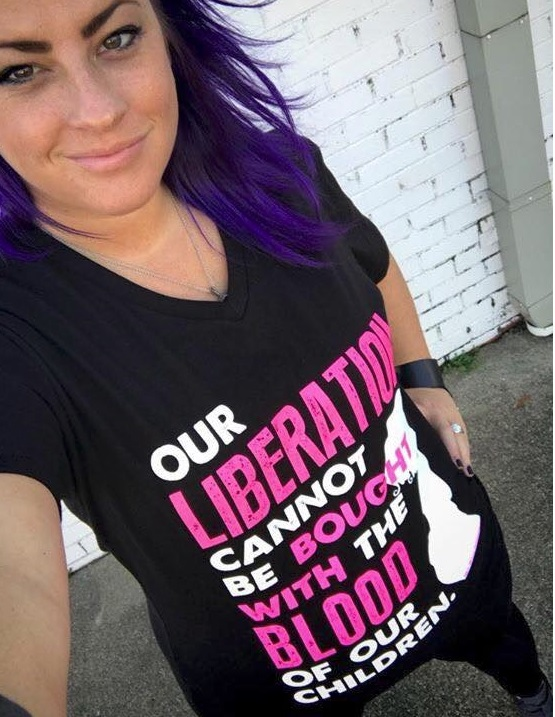
Herndon-De La Rosa in 2018

Herndon-De La Rosa founded the group New Wave Feminists in 2004. The group promotes the consistent life ethic, opposing the death penalty, torture, and unjust war. The group is a member of the Consistent Life Network, a non-sectarian and non-partisan international network of organisations embodying this philosophy.

While Herndon-De La Rosa and the New Wave Feminists are known primarily for opposition to abortion, she has also written on related subjects, such as an editorial published in The Dallas Morning News expressing opposition to calls for execution of Nikolas Cruz, and to the death penalty in general.

In 2018, Herndon-De La Rosa expelled co-founder Kristen Walker Hatten from her position as vice president of New Wave Feminists after it was leaked that she was allegedly a white nationalist in the wake of the election of Donald Trump. She has also criticized the association between some anti-abortion campaigners and the presidency of Donald Trump, as well as campaigning tactics of the mainstream anti-abortion movement.

In 2018, Herndon-De La Rosa traveled to Ireland to campaign against the repeal of the 8th Amendment, who gave a constitutional legal protection of the unborn and prohibition on abortion. The effort was ultimately futile as the Irish voted overwhelmingly to repeal it.

In July 2019, New Wave Feminists organized a campaign of over fifty anti-abortion groups that took more than $133,000 in supplies and $72,000 in funds to immigrant respite centers on the Texas-Mexico border. Supplies focused on the needs of immigrant mothers and their children.

In October 2019, Herndon-De La Rosa released a statement on social media announcing her personal and organizational intention to sever ties with Abby Johnson's "And Then There Were None" abortion opposition group. Her stated reason was Johnson's "blatantly racist statements" in a Twitter argument Johnson had with an African-American minister.

In response to the 2022 U.S. Supreme Court ruling in Dobbs v. Jackson Women's Health Organization, which denied a federal right to abortion, Herndon-De La Rosa expressed concern about the people who would be left behind in the wake of anti-abortion laws, especially those in states that lack social and economic safety nets.

We’re not trying to defund Planned Parenthood. We’re not trying to overturn Roe. Our work actually isn’t going to change one bit if Roe is overturned because our whole point is not necessarily in regards to legality. It’s about the reality women are facing. I see leaders taking away options, but they’re not necessarily supplementing them with other options for women.

== Women's March ==
On January 13, 2017, 2017 Women's March event organizers granted the pro-life feminist group New Wave Feminists partnership status. After the organization's involvement was publicized in The Atlantic, it was removed from the partners page on the march's website. Other anti-abortion groups that had been granted partnership status, including Abby Johnson's And Then There Were None (ATTWN) and Stanton Healthcare, were subsequently unlisted as partners as well. However, New Wave Feminists still took part in the official march. Herndon-De La Roasa told St. Louis Review that she felt welcome at the event.

Herndon-De La Rosa also attended the 2018 Women's March.

Regarding the 2021 Women's March, Herndon De La Rosa posted on Facebook: "It’s 100% an abortion rally, so obviously we can’t participate in the traditional way for this one." The previous Women's Marches she participated in had also expressly been in support of abortion.

== Stellar Shelter & Casa Maris ==
Hernon-De La Rosa co-founded the Stellar Shelter and Casa Maris with Karina Breceda, an immigration advocate, in 2022. The centers are located across from each other on the Mexico-United States border. The Stellar Shelter—also known as the "New Wave Feminists Consistent Life Ethic Center"—is a shelter for migrant women & children in Ciudad Juárez, Mexico. Casa Maris is an emergency shelter, also for migrant women and children, in El Paso, Texas.

The centers offer healthcare services, prenatal and parenting classes, and other assistance to migrant mothers, children, and single women. As of September 2023, over 100 women and children had been served by the Stellar Shelter alone.
