= Dublin Declaration on Maternal Healthcare =

The Dublin Declaration on Maternal Healthcare
- Created: September 8, 2012
- Subject: abortion
- Purpose: to restrict abortions

Official website
- https://www.dublindeclaration.com/

The Dublin Declaration on Maternal Healthcare is a declaration adopted by anti-abortion activists at a conference in Dublin on September 8, 2012. The declarations claims that abortion is never necessary to save a woman's life.

The key point is the distinction between an abortion (voluntary destruction of an embryo or foetus) and an early induction, in which the embryo or foetus is separated from the mother but not directly harmed or destroyed. If the child is very young, its survival may be virtually impossible outside its mother's body, but it can still be provided with appropriate care. Its death may occur as an unwanted consequence of necessary healthcare provided to the mother, but that does not constitute an abortion.

Under the Dublin Declaration's reasoning, standard care for threatening conditions such as ectopic pregnancies or eclampsia would remain the same, and does not constitute abortion, therefore is not within the scope of abortion bans.

The declaration's claims contradict the standard discourse that the possibility of safe and legal therapeutic abortion is important to protect women's lives and reduce maternal mortality.

The declaration has been translated into 18 languages. It has been used by anti-abortion activists in various countries in the abortion debate and to pressure politicians to restrict abortion access.

In Latin American countries, the declaration is widely circulated among conservative religious activists in Catholic and evangelical churches. In particular, its influence is strong in Chile and El Salvador. The declaration was actively used against the efforts to overturn abortion bans in Latin America.

In the United States, the declaration is promoted by an anti-abortion organization Live Action.

== Links ==
- Official website
