= Rainbow Pro-Life Alliance =

Organization

- Formation: 1990
- Purpose: LGBT organization opposed to the legalization of abortion
- Region served: United States
- Leader: Cecilia Brown
- Website: www.plagal.org

The Rainbow Pro-Life Alliance, formerly known as the Pro-Life Alliance of Gays and Lesbians (PLAGAL), is a United States-based interest group opposed to legalized elective abortion and supportive of alternatives to abortion.

The group was founded by Tom Sena in 1990 in Minneapolis, Minnesota, and Washington, D.C., under the name "Gays Against Abortion". The name was changed to "Pro-Life Alliance of Gays and Lesbians" in early 1991. Despite both names, the group is inclusive of all LGBT people, as well as straight allies. Its first President was Philip Arcidi, who was elected in 1994.

== Positions ==
The Rainbow Pro-Life Alliance has pointed to some research that shows a link between abortion and breast cancer that has generally been rejected by the medical community. They have also taken the position that even if a woman is infected with HIV she should not abort the fetus because there are ways to prevent the transmission of the virus from the mother. They support expanding access to antiretroviral drugs for all people who need such treatment, including pregnant women and their fetuses. In March 2005, the Rainbow Pro-Life Alliance came out in support of legislation introduced by Maine state legislator Brian Duprey, which assuming that science would discover a significant genetic component to homosexuality, would make it illegal for a woman to selectively abort a fetus based on predicted sexual orientation.

== Reaction from the gay community ==
Since the religious right is perceived as dominating the anti-abortion movement, LGBT supporters of legal abortion care question why any LGBT person would want to align themselves with a social movement that has traditionally opposed not only legalized abortion, but often also LGBT rights.

LGBT opponents of legal abortion counter that their beliefs on abortion derive from beliefs regarding nonviolence, human rights, and the interconnectedness of human rights. Although some Rainbow Pro-Life Alliance members are otherwise conservative, they span the entire political spectrum. Rainbow Pro-Life Alliance President Cecilia Brown, for example, is a member of the Green Party. Another national officer, Jackie Malone, is outspoken on disability rights.

As early as 1994, Chuck Volz, co-founder of the now-defunct Delaware Valley PLAGAL chapter, started a row in the local gay media when he condemned the sponsors of the Philadelphia AIDS walk for diverting "crucial funds" to assist in the abortion of HIV positive children.

Most of the debate within the gay and lesbian community remains peaceful, if not always civil. However, in 1995 the Rainbow Pro-Life Alliance applied for participation in Boston's annual Pride parade and was denied. The Rainbow Pro-Life Alliance set up a table along the parade route, where members distributed literature. During the parade, the table was surrounded by angry hecklers who tore up their leaflets, leading to police asking the Rainbow Pro-Life Alliance to leave the parade area to restore order.

At the 2000 Millennium March for Equality, major gay rights interest groups such as the Gay and Lesbian Alliance Against Defamation and the Human Rights Campaign endorsed pro-choice public policies, despite the protests from the Rainbow Pro-Life Alliance.

== Reactions from the anti-abortion community ==
The reaction from the anti-abortion community is divided. Some opponents of legal abortion see their position as part of a more secular, human rights position and sent letters of support for the Rainbow Pro-Life Alliance. Some of these individuals and organisations affiliate their opposition to abortion as part of a consistent life ethic. Others see the struggle against abortion in more pragmatic terms and welcomed the support of the Rainbow Pro-Life Alliance, without care for their positions on other issues.

Still other abortion opponents that see their position as part of a broader conservative religious movement, opposed the inclusion of an LGBT organization at anti-abortion events. The Catholic University of America in Washington, D.C., denied a request to allow the Rainbow Pro-Life Alliance to cosponsor an anti-abortion conference in January 2009, citing the group's support for same-sex marriage and condoning of homosexual sexual activity.
