= World Federation of Doctors Who Respect Human Life =

The World Federation of Doctors Who Respect Human Life is an international anti abortion rights medical organization advocating the fetal right to life. The federation also opposes human embryo research and in vitro fertilization. It was founded at an international congress in the Netherlands in June 1974, with a submission on behalf 70,000 doctors.
