= Right to Life Australia =

Australian anti-abortion organization

Right to Life Australia (The Right to Life Australia Inc.) operated as an unincorporated organisation lobbying for consistent life ethic policies such as total opposition to abortion, euthanasia, and stem cell research. Margaret Tighe was the last known President until retiring in 2010, and Toni Turnbull of South Australia was the last known Vice President. While the group states it was a non-denominational Christian organisation, most of those involved identify as Roman Catholics.

The Right to Life Australia was established after tensions arose between the National Right to Life Association and the Association's Victoria-based branch. According to contributors, the tension resulted from 'tactics that embarrassed the otherwise conservative right-to-lifers'. By 1980, the new Right to Life Australia group was drafting appeal letters for funds despite what was described at the time as "a lot of objections to the establishment of this organisation".

The Right to Life Australia Inc organisation was begun by President Margaret Tighe as a national organisation. However, there were already state-based groups, such as Right to Life Western Australia, that did not wish to join a national body. Right to Life WA declined to join a national coalition of organisations lobbying against abortion and voluntary assisted dying and criticised the "proliferation of pro-life groups and associations".

== History ==
The Right To Life Australia Inc. was an unincorporated entity established in Brunswick, Victoria, in 2000. Its official name since 2000 was Right to Life Australia.

It ran campaigns and public demonstrations primarily against members of the feminist network EMILY's List. Right to Life Australia members also lobbied politicians and gave talks to community groups.

Right to Life Australia organised an annual conference and a newsletter, and it funded Pregnancy Counseling Australia to provide directive advice against the termination of pregnancy.

Right to Life Australia Inc was involved in the passing of the 1996 Euthanasia Bill and the Research Involving Human Embryos Bill 2002. In 2005, the organisation protested outside Alfred Hospital on the Maria Korp case when Victoria's Public Advocate announced that Maria would begin palliative care after 163 days of being in a persistent vegetative state. Despite protests from Right to Life Australia Inc, ABC radio reported that extensive consultation with close friends, family and Maria's priest as well as all medical advice concluded that palliative care was in Maria's best interest.

== Campaigns and actions ==
The Fertility Control Clinic was opened in East Melbourne in 1972 by a group of feminists seeking to improve access of abortion. It subsequently became the site of most Right to Life protests.

In 1978, 10 members of Right to Life were forcibly removed from the clinic by police after they sat in a hallway outside an operating theatre and refused to move. Among them was then President Margaret Tighe.

In 1986, the member for the division of Lowe, Michael Maher, raised two publications from Margaret Tighe in the House of Representatives regarding claims of misrepresentation. Maher stated that his words and position were misrepresented in a report by the then Victorian Right to Life organisation authorised by Tighe and in electorate materials distributed by her. Maher stated: "She chose, for her own political reasons, to ignore that statement. I just wanted to state, correctly on the record, my reasons, and I thank the House for giving me this time today. The misrepresentation of my views does this lady's cause no good."

In 1996, independent member of the Australian Capital Territory Legislative Assembly, Michael Moore, referred to Margaret Tighe of the Right to Life Movement while speaking on euthanasia, saying, "...in the media, some people, including Margaret Tighe of the Right to Life movement, were able to say that this is a shame for Australia... It is the people like Margaret Tighe who should wear the shame, Mr Speaker...They will wear the shame for allowing these people to suffer".

In 1998, the Melbourne University Debating Society held a debate on whether Victoria should follow Western Australia's path of abortion law reform. The anti-abortion position was argued by Meredith Gawler, former president of the university's Right to Life Club and president of The Right to Life, Margaret Tighe. The results of the debate were a clear victory for the pro-choice position.

In 2001, Peter Knight walked into the privately run East Melbourne abortion provider carrying a rifle and other weapons, as well as 16 litres of kerosene. Knight fatally shot a security guard before clinic staff and patients overpowered him. Knight later stated he planned to use homemade gags and door jambs to restrain the patients and staff inside the clinic before dousing them with kerosene. There were 15 staff members and 26 patients present that day. He then planned to move on to target another Melbourne abortion provider. In a radio interview on the day of the fatal shooting, the Right to Life Australia Inc President expressed sympathy with Knight, saying violence was to be expected "because people get angry at what goes on in such places". That sparked outrage and led to the popularization of the pro-choice chant "Right to Life, your name's a lie, you don't care if women die!".

In 2007, Right to Life successfully campaigned to ban a book titled The Peaceful Pill by Dr Phillip Nitschke. The Classification Review Board stated the book was not banned on moral grounds but because it encouraged illegal activity.

Right to Life lobbied heavily against the 2008 Victorian Abortion Law Reform Bill introduced by Upper House member Candy Broad. The lobbying was unsuccessful, and the bill passed with overwhelming support, resulting in the Menhennit ruling (1969) being codified and access to abortion being extended to include terminations after 23 weeks' gestation.

In 2013, Right to Life Australia was questioned about anti-abortion flyers distributed in Albury. The flyers were printed on the back of letters containing personal information and may have breached privacy laws. Included in the material was a 1988 letter from Corporate Affairs Victoria detailing outstanding lodging fees and threatened to de-register the company. While then-President, Margaret Tighe, claimed the flyers were unrelated to Right to Life Australia, they also featured her signature.

In 2017, Right to Life Australia campaigned against the Victorian Voluntary Assisted Dying Bill. The campaign was unsuccessful, and the bill passed. From 19 June 2019, Victorians were able to access voluntary assisted dying if they were in late stages of advanced disease.

Since abortion has been decriminalised across all Australian jurisdictions, Right to Life Australia has lobbied for its recriminalisation with the President stating in 2023: "I think there should be a penalty. I think we should be lenient to some extent".
