= Sanctity of life =

Principle stating that human life is sacred and should be protected

In religion and ethics, the sanctity of life, sometimes described as the inviolability of life, is a principle of implied protection regarding aspects of sentient life that are said to be holy, sacred, or otherwise of such value that they are not to be violated. This can be applied to humans, animals or (in the practice of Ahimsa) even micro-organisms. Sanctity of life sits at the centre of debate over abortion and euthanasia.

== In Christianity ==
The phrase sanctity of life refers to the idea that humans are sacred, holy, and precious, since each human life ultimately belongs to God. Although the phrase was used primarily in the 19th century in Protestant discourse, since World War II the phrase has been used in Catholic moral theology and, following Roe v. Wade, Evangelical Christian moral rhetoric.

The absolute sanctity of life, often contrasted with valuing the quality of life, is the basis of all Catholic teaching about the fifth commandment in the Ten Commandments.

== In Judaism ==
Pikuach nefesh allows the Jewish person to override all other Jewish laws and practices in order to preserve human life. It places the conservation of humanity and the survival of a human being above every other possible thing. It applies to both saving the lives of Jews and non-Jews.

All denominations of Judaism allow abortion to save the life of the mother, but there is no common consensus for other situations in which abortion could be used. Due to the treatment of a foetus as a part of the mother, but not as a separate human being, this is often cited to permit abortion by Jewish people.

== In Islam ==
Islam considers all life forms sacred, but puts humans above other living things. Islam considers the unlawful killing of a person on the same level as the killing of all humanity. The same is applicable in the inverse: saving a life is as important as saving the entire of humanity.

The Qur'an never explicitly refers to abortion, but other teachings can be applied to the matter. Muslims believe that ensoulment occurs on the 120th day of gestation. Before ensoulment, abortion is allowed for foetal anomalies. After ensoulment, all schools of Islam allow abortion to save the life of the mother, and in the case of an intrauterine death (miscarriage), but on little other grounds. However, there is a growing movement to allow abortion for malformed foetuses whose deaths are inevitable shortly after birth. The inability to provide for a foetus is generally dismissed as an acceptable reason, but some schools of thought are more lenient on the matter.

== In Eastern religions ==
In Western thought, sanctity of life is usually applied solely to the human species (anthropocentrism, sometimes called dominionism), in marked contrast to many schools of Eastern philosophy, which often hold that all animal life is sacred―in some cases to such a degree that, for example, practitioners of Jainism carry brushes with which to sweep insects from their path, lest they inadvertently tread upon them.

== See also ==
- Abortion-rights movements
- Anti-abortion movements
- Catholic Church and capital punishment
- Buddhism
- Jainism
- Consistent life ethic
- Culture of life
- Fetal protection
- Medical ethics
- National Sanctity of Human Life Day (in the US)
- Religion and abortion
- Right to life
- Sanctity of Life Act, US bill, repeatedly introduced since 1995, that has never become law
