= Christopher West =

American writer (born 1969)

- Born: 1969 (age 56–57)
- Education: University of Maryland; John Paul II Institute; Pontifex University
- Occupations: Educator, Theologian, YouTuber
- Spouse: Wendy West
- Children: 5

Christopher West (born 1969) is a Catholic author and speaker on gender and sexuality, best known for his work on Pope John Paul II’s series of audience addresses entitled Theology of the Body.

== Biography ==
=== Education ===
West graduated from Lancaster Catholic High School in the USA in 1988. He received a Bachelor of Arts in Anthropology in 1992 from the University of Maryland. In 1996 he was certified as an Instructor of Marriage Preparation from the Archdiocese of Washington, D.C. In 1997, he obtained a Master of Theological Studies at the John Paul II Institute at the Catholic University of America. Afterwards he became a Certified Catechist by the Archdiocese of Denver Catechetical School. He has also received an honorary doctorate from DeSales University. In December 2019 West received a Doctor of Theology degree from Pontifex University, which is based in Atlanta, GA.

=== Career ===
West has been delivering lectures since 1997, mostly on topics such as Christian anthropology, the Nicene Creed, morality, the sacraments, sexuality, and family life. He has also spoken on national radio and on television. He is a cofounder of the Theology of the Body Institute, which offers graduate level courses and other training programs on the Theology of the Body. West opposes homosexual sex and the use of contraception because West—in line with Catholic teaching—says that sex without the possibility of pregnancy is a sin.

=== Personal life ===
He and his wife, Wendy, reside in Lancaster County, Pennsylvania and have five children together.

== Reception ==
=== Support ===
West's work has attracted support from many Catholics, including both members of the laity and several bishops.

Cecilia LeChevallier of the Diocese of Camden commented that "Christopher West is able to synthesize the Theology of the Body in an understandable and exciting way that gets people excited about it and excited about living it."

Charles J. Chaput, O.F.M. Cap. Archbishop of Philadelphia says that "Christopher West’s keen grasp of John Paul II’s Theology of the Body and his ability to make it accessible to others is changing lives, strengthening marriages, and renewing people’s faith in the Church across the country and internationally." More recently, Chaput said, "I’ve known and respected Christopher for many years. He served with good effect on my staff in Denver early in my tenure there. He’s done a wonderful job translating John Paul II’s Theology of the Body into popular practice."

Moral theologian Dr. Janet Smith has defended West against his critics, saying his work is "completely sound."

Justin Cardinal Rigali, Archbishop Emeritus of Philadelphia, and Kevin Rhoades, Bishop of Fort Wayne-South Bend, issued a joint statement in support of West's work.

Bishop Ronald Gainer of West's hometown Roman Catholic Diocese of Harrisburg wrote a letter of good standing supporting West.

=== Criticism ===
Theologian David L. Schindler charged West with promoting a "pansexualist tendency" that ties all important human and supernatural activity back to sex without making necessary distinctions.

Dr. Alice von Hildebrand, widow of Catholic theologian Dietrich von Hildebrand, has said West's approach has become too self-assured. She criticized his presentations as irreverent and insensitive to the "tremendous dangers" of concupiscence.

=== Response ===
West also responded to many of the critiques, acknowledging that "so long as we are on earth, we will always have to battle with concupiscence" and conceding "In some of my earliest lectures and tapes, I confess that I did not emphasize this important point clearly enough." However, he continues with the rhetorical question, taken from Veritatis Splendor 103, "Of which man are we speaking?" and discusses the teaching of John Paul II that "[Christ] has given us the possibility of realizing the entire truth of our being; he has set our freedom free from the domination of concupiscence."

== Books ==
- (2023) Eating the Sunrise: Meditations on the Liturgy & Our Hunger for Beauty (Beauty Trilogy) ISBN 978-1-7379945-3-4
- (2020) Our Bodies Tell God's Story: Discovering the Divine Plan for Love, Sex, and Gender ISBN 978-1-58743-427-3
- (2018) Eclipse of the Body: How we Lost the Meaning of Sex, Gender, Marriage, & Family (And How to Reclaim It)
- (2018) Word Made Flesh: A Companion to the Sunday Readings (Cycle C) eBook/paperback 2018 ISBN 978-1-59471-859-5
- (2015) Pope Francis To Go: Bite-Sized Morsels from The Joy of the Gospel eBook/paperback 2014 ISBN 978-0-9863543-0-4
- (2013) Fill These Hearts: God, Sex and the Universal Longing 2013 ISBN 9780307987136
- (2012) At the Heart of the Gospel: Reclaiming the Body for the New Evangelization 2012 ISBN 978-0-307-98711-2
- (2008) Heaven's Song 2008 ISBN 1-934217-46-8
- (2007) The Love that Satisfies 2007 ISBN 1-934217-13-1
- (2004) Theology of the Body for Beginners, 2004 ISBN 1-932645-34-9
- (2004) Good News About Sex and Marriage 2004 ISBN 0-86716-619-3
- (2003) Theology of the Body Explained : A Commentary on John Paul II's "Gospel of the Body" 2003 ISBN 0-8198-7410-8
- (2007) Theology of the Body Explained : A Commentary on John Paul II's "Man and Woman He Created Them" 2007 ISBN 0-8198-7425-6
