= Memory and Identity =

Book by Pope John Paul II

Memory and Identity is the last book written by Pope John Paul II. It was published in 2005. The work consists of 26 chapters, each opening with a short narrative paragraph, sometimes including one or more questions. The rest of the chapter consists of the Pope's answers or reactions to the opening paragraph.

== Description ==
The chapters are organized into five sections and an epilogue. The sections discuss his views on the issues of:

1) The nature and limitations of evil; he asserts that 'the ideologies of evil are profoundly rooted in the history of European thought'; especially the French Enlightenment, 'radically atheist Marxist revolution', 'National Socialist ideology', and abortion/ gay rights conferred by the European parliament. Redemption is the Divine limit imposed on evil, and is given to Man as his task.

2) The relationship between freedom and responsibility; a discussion of the 'just good', the 'useful good' and the 'pleasurable good' brings him to criticize modern utilitarianism. Freedom must be commensurate with truth and love.

3) The nature of nationalism in the context of history and culture; patriotism and culture are expressions of love, whereas nationalism pursues the good of one's own nation alone.

4) The current social state of affairs in Europe; liberty, equality and fraternity grew out of the Gospel, but early capitalism did much damage to these principles. Europe was also uniquely devastated by two world wars.

5) The virtues and weaknesses of democracy; Parliaments confer abortion rights but do nothing to defend the unborn child.

The epilogue is a first hand account of the assassination attempt on him on 13 May 1981.

It also mentions the importance of the Thomistic philosophy and theology of the prominent doctor of the Catholic Church St. Thomas Aquinas to come to a deeper understanding of the Pope's personalist (phenomenological) presentation of Humanae Vitae in his Theology of the Body catechesis, which he thought had its limitations. He writes:

If we wish to speak rationally about good and evil, we have to return to St. Thomas Aquinas, that is, to the philosophy of being. With the phenomenological method, for example, we can study experiences of morality, religion, or simply what it is to be human, and draw from them a significant enrichment of our knowledge. Yet we must not forget that all these analyses implicitly presuppose the reality of the Absolute Being and also the reality of being human, that is, being a creature. If we do not set out from such 'realist' presuppositions, we end up in a vacuum.
