= Consistent life ethic =

Ethic opposing loss of life

The consistent life ethic (CLE), also known as the consistent ethic of life or whole life ethic, is an ethic that opposes abortion, capital punishment, assisted suicide, euthanasia, and unjust war. Some adherents go as far as full pacifism and so oppose all war. Many authors have understood the ethic to be relevant to a broad variety of areas of public policy as well as social justice issues. The term was popularized in 1983 by the Catholic prelate Joseph Bernardin in the United States to express an ideology based on the premise that all human life is sacred and should be protected by law. While there are many adherents, CLE is a Catholic doctrine and is therefore sometimes associated with the Catholic Church.

== History ==
The phrase "consistent ethic of life" was used as far back as a 1971 speech delivered by then-Archbishop Humberto Medeiros of Boston.

=== Eileen Egan ===
In 1971, the Catholic pacifist Eileen Egan coined the phrase "seamless garment" to describe a holistic reverence for life. The phrase is a Bible reference from John 19:23 to the seamless robe of Jesus, which his executioners left whole rather than dividing it at his execution. The seamless garment philosophy holds that issues such as abortion, capital punishment, militarism, euthanasia, social injustice, and economic injustice all demand a consistent application of moral principles valuing the sanctity of human life. "The protection of life", said Egan, "is a seamless garment. You can't protect some life and not others." Her words were meant to challenge members of society who divided their commitment to protecting and cherishing human life, choosing anti-war stances but not anti-abortion work, or those members of the anti-abortion movement who were in favor of capital punishment.

=== J. Bryan Hehir ===
J. Bryan Hehir, staff writer for the United States Conference of Catholic Bishops on political affairs, is credited by Charles Curran with coining the term "consistent ethic of life."

=== Cardinal Joseph Bernardin ===
Cardinal Joseph Bernardin of Chicago helped publicize the consistent life ethic idea, initially in a lecture at Fordham University, December 6, 1983. At first Bernardin spoke out against nuclear war and abortion. However, he quickly expanded the scope of his view to include all aspects of human life. In that Fordham University lecture, Bernardin said: "The spectrum of life cuts across the issues of genetics, abortion, capital punishment, modern warfare and the care of the terminally ill." Bernardin said that although each of the issues was distinct, nevertheless the issues were linked since the valuing and defending of (human) life were, he believed, at the center of both issues. Bernardin told an audience in Portland, Oregon: "When human life is considered 'cheap' or easily expendable in one area, eventually nothing is held as sacred and all lives are in jeopardy."

Bernardin drew his stance from New Testament principles, specifically of forgiveness and reconciliation, yet he argued that neither the themes nor the content generated from those themes were exclusively Christian. By doing this, Bernardin attempted to create a dialogue with others who were not necessarily aligned with Christianity.

Bernardin and other advocates of this ethic sought to form a consistent policy that would link abortion, capital punishment, economic injustice, euthanasia, and unjust war. Bernardin sought to unify politically conservative and liberal Catholics, in a common opposition to abortion, euthanasia and the capital punishment, in the United States. By relying on fundamental principles, Bernardin also sought to coordinate work on several different spheres of Catholic moral theology. In addition, Bernardin argued that since the 1950s the church had moved against its own historical, casuistic exceptions to the protection of life. "To summarize the shift succinctly, the presumption against taking human life has been strengthened and the exceptions made ever more restrictive."

=== Growth and present-day activity ===
The non-profit organization Consistent Life Network, founded in 1987 as the Seamless Garment Network, promotes adherence to the ethic through education and non-violent action. Individual endorsers belonging to the organization include Father Daniel Berrigan, theologian Harvey Cox, Village Voice columnist Nat Hentoff, Father Theodore Hesburgh, actress Patricia Heaton, L'Arche founder Jean Vanier, death penalty activist Sister Helen Prejean, pastor and activist Patrick Mahoney, author Ken Kesey, Archbishop of Canterbury Rowan Williams and Nobel Peace Prize laureates Mairead Corrigan Maguire and Adolfo Pérez Esquivel. Rachel MacNair, for ten years (1994–2004) President of Feminists for Life, an anti-abortion organization, is the director of the Institute for Integrated Social Analysis, the research arm of Consistent Life Network.

The Network also consists of member groups such as Rehumanize International, created under the name Life Matters Journal by Aimee Murphy in 2011. Secular Pro-Life, Democrats for Life of America, Rainbow Pro-Life Alliance (formerly the Pro-Life Alliance of Gays and Lesbians), and All Our Lives (a pro-contraception feminist group), New Wave Feminists (led by Destiny Herndon-De La Rosa), and the American Solidarity Party, a Christian Democratic political party, are all additional members. These organizations collaborate with Consistent Life Network for activism and volunteer outreach efforts.

Along with the American Solidarity Party, the Prohibition Party, a minor political party in the United States, endorses a consistent life ethic.

The Catholic Worker Movement, established by Dorothy Day and Peter Maurin, is an organization primarily aimed towards grassroots organization and volunteer work to serve the poor, marginalized, and those facing unexpected pregnancies.

Other prominent authors who have written in support of the consistent life ethic include Frank Pavone, John Dear, Ron Sider, James Hedges, Tony Campolo, Joel Hunter, Wendell Berry, and Shane Claiborne who wrote in favor in the 2000s and 2010s.

In 2023, theologian Steven P. Millies, writing in the Jesuit magazine America, opined that the consistent life ethic, generally speaking, has been a failure: "Depressingly, 40 years since Cardinal Bernardin first proposed the consistent ethic of life, the ethic remains mired in the same senseless, polarized partisanship that Bernardin proposed the ethic to overcome."

== Views ==
=== Abortion ===
Bernardin considered opposition to abortion to be an integral part of the consistent life ethic. In a 1988 interview with National Catholic Register, he stated, "I feel very, very strongly about the right to life of the unborn, the weakest and most vulnerable of human beings. I don’t see how you can subscribe to the consistent ethic and then vote for someone who feels that abortion is a 'basic right' of the individual. The consequence of that position would be an absence of legal protection for the unborn."

Many consistent life ethic adherents advocate for increased social support for parents in addition to legal protection for the unborn.

Advocates for the consistent life ethic have reacted positively to the release of the landmark Dobbs v. Jackson Women's Health Organization decision (2022), which overruled both Roe v. Wade (1973) and Planned Parenthood v. Casey (1992). According to consistent life ethic advocate Herb Geraghty, "Right now is clearly a moment for celebration, and for mourning the lives that have been lost in the last 50 years due to the Roe v. Wade decision."

=== Capital punishment ===
In a 1977 statement following the Gregg v. Georgia decision—which reaffirmed the United States Supreme Court's acceptance of the use of the death penalty in the United States—Bernardin wrote, "Many have expressed the view [...] that in this day of increasing violence and disregard for human life, a return to the use of capital punishment can only lead to further erosion of respect for life and to the increased brutalization of our society."

Bernardin's opposition to capital punishment was rooted in the conviction that an atmosphere of respect for life must pervade a society, and resorting to the death penalty would not support this attitude. Modern-day adherents to the consistent life ethic continue to oppose the use of capital punishment; in this advocacy, some echo Bernardin's appeal to the sanctity of life, while others emphasize the relationships between class, race and capital punishment to argue that there is not a way for capital punishment to be used justly.

One outspoken anti-death penalty activist is Sister Helen Prejean. Her books Dead Man Walking and The Death of Innocents: An Eyewitness Account to Wrongful Executions are autobiographical accounts of the time she spent ministering to death row inmates.

=== Health care ===
Bernardin understood the consistent life ethic as implying a societal responsibility to provide adequate health care for all, especially the poor.

As such, appeals to the consistent life ethic have been made in support of universal health care.

=== In vitro fertilization ===
In vitro fertilization is a process in which multiple viable embryos are created, and a single one implanted, with the extra ones frozen for potential future use. After the parents stop paying the storage fees for these, they are discarded, which has been opposed by anti-abortion advocates.

Herb Geraghty, former executive director of the secular group Rehumanize International, which promotes the consistent life ethic, said, "We should not intentionally end the life of a human being, regardless of where they are in their lifecycle, in a womb or in a fertility lab", but also that he does not know what should be done with the "thousands of human beings who are currently frozen against their will."

=== Abuse of alcohol and other drugs ===
James Hedges, in an article titled "Prohibition Platform incorporates a Consistent Life Ethic," stated that "Alcohol in many ways causes 'premature deaths,' and it degrades the quality of life before death." However, with the exception of the Prohibition Party, most organizations that embrace a consistent life ethic do not take a stance on the prohibition of alcohol.

=== Refugees ===
The consistent life ethic has been invoked to include care for immigrants and refugees. While not directly appealing to the consistent life ethic, other Catholics have sought to apply the pro-life ethic to the issue of immigration.

== Criticisms ==
One criticism made of the consistent life ethic position is that it inadvertently helped provide "cover" or support for politicians who supported legalized abortion or wanted to minimize this issue, a circumstance that Bernardin himself both recognized and deplored. A critic of Joseph Bernardin, George Weigel rejected the claims that the consistent life ethic had been created to cover up for abortion rights, saying that Bernardin was "a committed pro-lifer". He still criticized the concept as a legacy of what he considers to be Bernardin's "culturally accommodating Catholicism".

The concept of a consistent life ethic is often rejected in the United States and abroad by those who prefer to use the concept of a culture of life as was promoted by Pope John Paul II and Pope Benedict XVI in their encyclicals. Archbishop José Gómez of Los Angeles dismissed the "seamless garment" approach in 2016 because in his view it results in "a mistaken idea that all issues are morally equivalent". The "seamless garment" approach was also criticized by then-Cardinal Joseph Ratzinger while he was serving as Prefect of the Congregation for the Doctrine of the Faith. In a July 2004 letter written to now former-Cardinal Theodore McCarrick and to the United States Bishops as a whole, Cardinal Ratzinger makes it clear that the church does not treat capital punishment with the same moral weight that it does abortion and euthanasia: "Not all moral issues have the same moral weight as abortion and euthanasia. For example, if a Catholic were to be at odds with the Holy Father [the Pope] on the application of capital punishment or on the decision to wage war, he would not for that reason be considered unworthy to present himself to receive Holy Communion...There may be a legitimate diversity of opinion even among Catholics about waging war and applying the death penalty, but not however with regard to abortion and euthanasia."

== See also ==
- Abortion debate
- Ahimsa
- Anti-abortion feminism
- Catholic social teaching
- Christian pacifism
- Culture of life
- Sins that cry to heaven
- Stem cell controversy

== Sources ==
- Bernardin, Joseph (1988). Consistent ethics of life. Sheed and Ward.
- Byrnes, Timothy A. "The politics of the American Catholic hierarchy". Political Science Quarterly 108 (3): 497. 1993.
- McClintock, Jamie S., and Perl, Paul. "The Catholic 'Consistent Life Ethic' and Attitudes Toward Capital Punishment and Welfare Reform." Sociology of Religion. 62(2001): 275–299
- McCormick, Richard A. "The Quality of Life, the Sanctity of Life." The Hastings Center Report 8, No 1 (1978): 30–36.
- McHugh, J. T. "Building a Culture of Life: A Catholic Perspective". Christian Bioethics, 2001 (Taylor & Francis)
- Wallis, Jim. God's Politics, 2004.
