= Anti-abortion movements =

Movement that believes abortion should be illegal

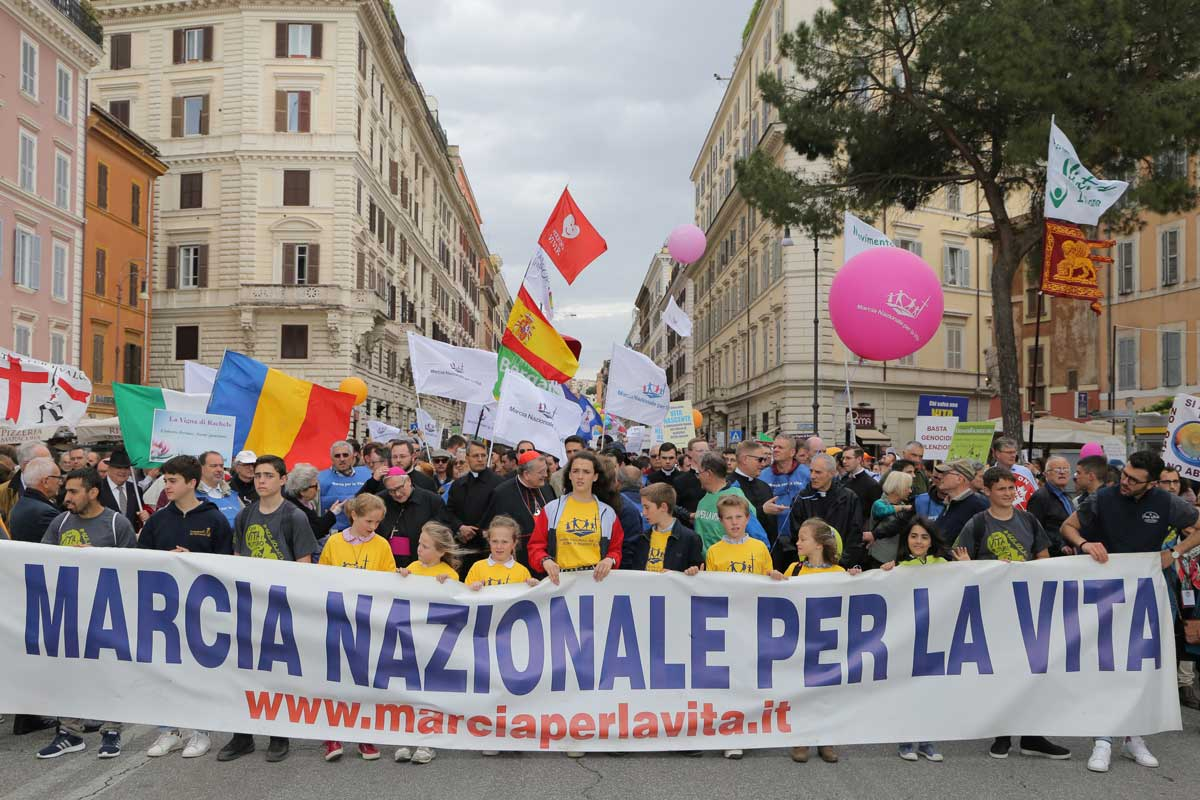
An anti-abortion demonstration in Rome in 2019

Anti-abortion movements, also self-styled as pro-life movements, are involved in the abortion debate advocating against the practice of abortion and its legality. Many anti-abortion movements began as countermovements in response to the legalization of elective abortions.

== Europe ==
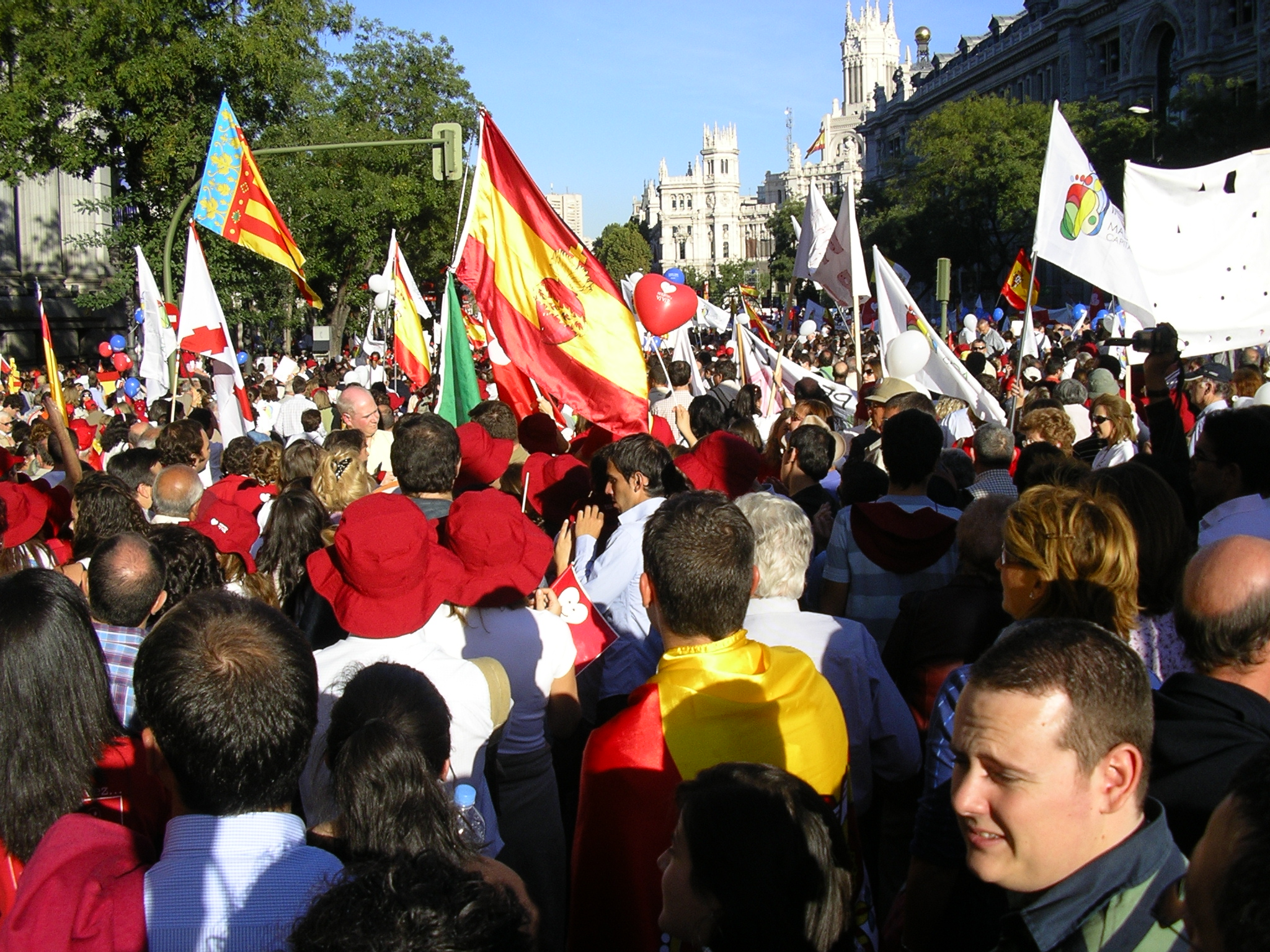
"Each Life Matters" demonstration in Madrid in October 2009

In Europe, abortion law varies by country, and has been legalized through parliamentary acts in some countries, and constitutionally banned or heavily restricted in others. In Western Europe this has had the effect at once of both more closely regulating the use of abortion, and at the same time mediating and reducing the impact anti-abortion campaigns have had on the law.

=== France ===
The first specifically anti-abortion organization in France, Laissez-les-vivre-SOS futures mères, was created in 1971 during the debate that was to lead to the Veil Law in 1975. Its main spokesman was the geneticist Jérôme Lejeune. Since 2005, the French anti-abortion movement has organized an annual March for Life.

The 1920 abortion laws of France have not been entirely repealed leading to ambiguity in the nation's policies. By 1975, Simone Veil, the minister for health, introduced legislation that specifically in cases of distress "tolerated" abortion up to ten weeks. Abortions after this date are only cleared by the government if the pregnancy endangers the health of the woman or will result in the birth of a child with a severe and incurable disease. After twelve weeks, abortion, except for "therapeutic abortion, under the terms of Article 317 of the Criminal Code, is a crime, punishable by 6 months to 10 years in prison, a fine of between 1800 and 250,000 Francs, and loss of professional license."

Catholics and right-wing political groups continue to protest abortion. The far-right party National Rally (formerly National Front), has attempted unsuccessfully to decrease funding for abortions.

=== Ireland ===
There are several major anti-abortion groups in the Republic of Ireland, including Pro Life Campaign, Youth Defence and the Iona Institute. The Thirty-sixth Amendment of the Constitution of Ireland (2018) provided for legal abortion in Ireland, but several anti-abortion parties still campaign, including Aontú and the National Party.

=== Liechtenstein ===
In Liechtenstein, an application to legalize abortions was rejected by a slim majority in a referendum in 2011. The opponents, which included Prince Alois, got 500 votes more and eventually settled at 52.3 percent compared with 47.7 percent.

Prince Alois had announced the use of his veto in advance if necessary to prevent the introduction of abortion.

=== Russia ===
Abortion is legal in Russia as an elective procedure up to the 12th week of pregnancy, and in special circumstances at later stages. The abortion issue gained renewed attention in 2011 in a debate that The New York Times says "has begun to sound like the debate in the United States". Parliament passed and President Dmitri Medvedev signed several restrictions on abortion into law to combat "a falling birthrate" and "plunging population". The restrictions include requiring abortion providers to devote 10% of advertising costs to describing the dangers of abortion to a woman's health and make it illegal to describe abortion as a safe medical procedure. Medvedev's wife Svetlana Medvedeva has taken up the anti-abortion cause in Russia in a weeklong national campaign against abortion called "Give Me Life!" and a "Day of Family, Love and Faithfulness" by her Foundation for Social and Cultural Initiatives in conjunction with the Russian Orthodox Church.

=== Spain ===
In Spain, over one million demonstrators took part in a march in Madrid in October 2009 to protest plans by the government of José Luis Zapatero to legalize elective abortions and eliminate parental consent restrictions.

=== United Kingdom ===
In the United Kingdom, the most prominent anti-abortion organization is the Society for the Protection of Unborn Children. It was formed at the time of the passage of the 1967 Abortion Act which liberalized abortion law. The group campaigns against abortion, often using questionable claims, and supports protests at pregnancy clinics. The Abortion Act of 1967 had a significant effect in Britain (excluding Northern Ireland). The Act states that if at least two doctors deem the reasons for abortion to be in alignment with the Act, it can legally be performed. This still means that the punishment for women who obtain abortions contrary to the Act are faced with potential life imprisonment. Doctors too can be prosecuted if they are found administering abortions without reasonable cause. The Abortion Act of 1967 did not apply in Northern Ireland. Women living there who sought abortions either had to travel to Britain to receive an abortion or potentially face criminal charges for purchasing abortion pills illegally.

To this day, anti-abortion activists routinely stand outside many abortion clinics; their goal is to discourage women from entering the clinics. This is through two processes, known as "prayer vigils", which are sometimes quiet and other times said aloud to actively dissuade; and "pavement counseling", where activists approach women entering clinics in order to persuade them to continue with their pregnancies. This is a practice held in low regard by many, as it causes anxiety and distress.

== Middle East ==
=== Israel ===
In Israel, the major anti-abortion organization is Efrat. Efrat activists primarily raise funds to relieve the "financial and social pressures" on pregnant women so that they will not terminate their pregnancies. However, this activity is only carried out in the Jewish sector in Israeli society, as Efrat officially views abortion among Jews as a demographic threat to the Jewish people.

== Americas ==
=== United States ===
In the 19th century United States, Anthony Comstock launched an 'anti-vice crusade' that included opposition to contraception and abortion. He successfully got the US Congress to pass laws later known as the Comstock laws that included provisions that made it illegal to send materials used for abortion through the mail. These laws have been referenced by modern anti-abortion campaigners in the US and cited in court cases to stop the mailing of abortion medication.

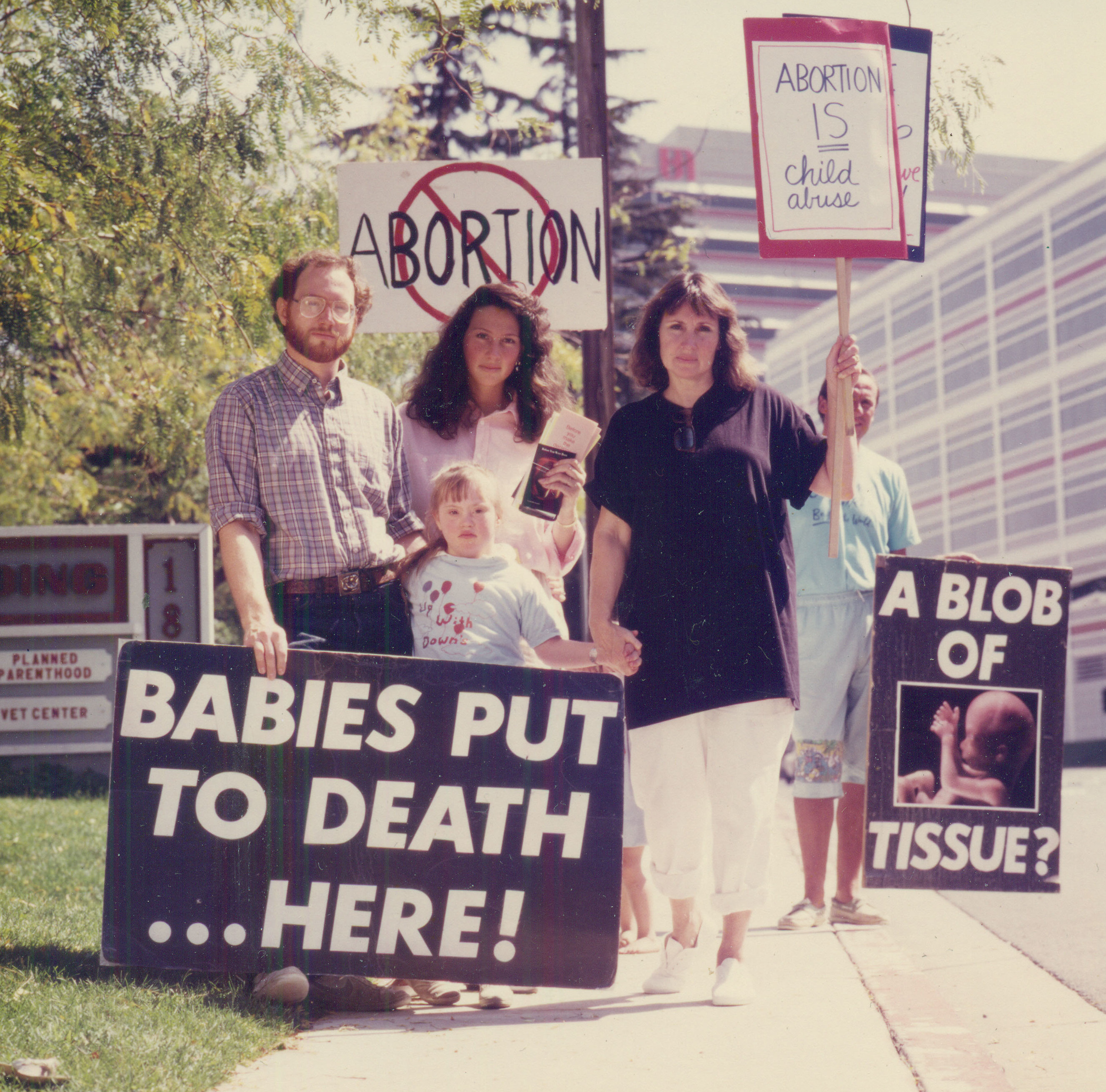
An anti-abortion protest outside an abortion clinic in the San Francisco Bay Area in 1986

The United States anti-abortion movement formed as a response to the landmark 1973 Roe v. Wade and Doe v. Bolton U.S. Supreme Court decisions with many anti-abortion organizations having emerged since then. There is also a smaller consistent life ethic movement, favoring a philosophy which opposes all forms of killing, including abortion, war, euthanasia, and capital punishment.

The current movement is in part a continuation of previous debates on abortion that led to the practice being banned in all states by the late 19th century. The initial movement was led by physicians, but also included politicians and feminists. Among physicians, advances in medical knowledge played a significant role in influencing anti-abortion opinion. Quickening, which had previously been thought to be the point at which the soul entered a human, was discovered to be a relatively unimportant step in fetal development, causing many medical professionals to rethink their positions on early term abortions. Ideologically, the Hippocratic Oath and the medical mentality of that age to defend the value of human life as an absolute also played a significant role in molding opinions about abortion.

Meanwhile, many 19th-century feminists tended to regard abortion as an undesirable necessity forced upon women by thoughtless men. The "free love" wing of the feminist movement refused to advocate abortion and treated the practice as an example of the hideous extremes to which modern marriage was driving women. Marital rape and the seduction of unmarried women were societal ills which feminists believed caused the need to abort, as men did not respect women's right to abstinence.

Anti-abortion groups like Students for Life of America and Susan B. Anthony Pro-Life America are at times associated with conservatism. Other groups, such as Focus on the Family, are considered a part of the Christian right. They call themselves "pro-life" because they are often united in their belief that a fetus is a person that has legal rights. Since the U.S. Supreme Court decision Dobbs v. Jackson Women's Health Organization, some of these organizations have turned their attention to banning abortions at the state and local level and asking the U.S. Supreme Court to recognize fetal personhood under the Constitution.

=== Canada ===
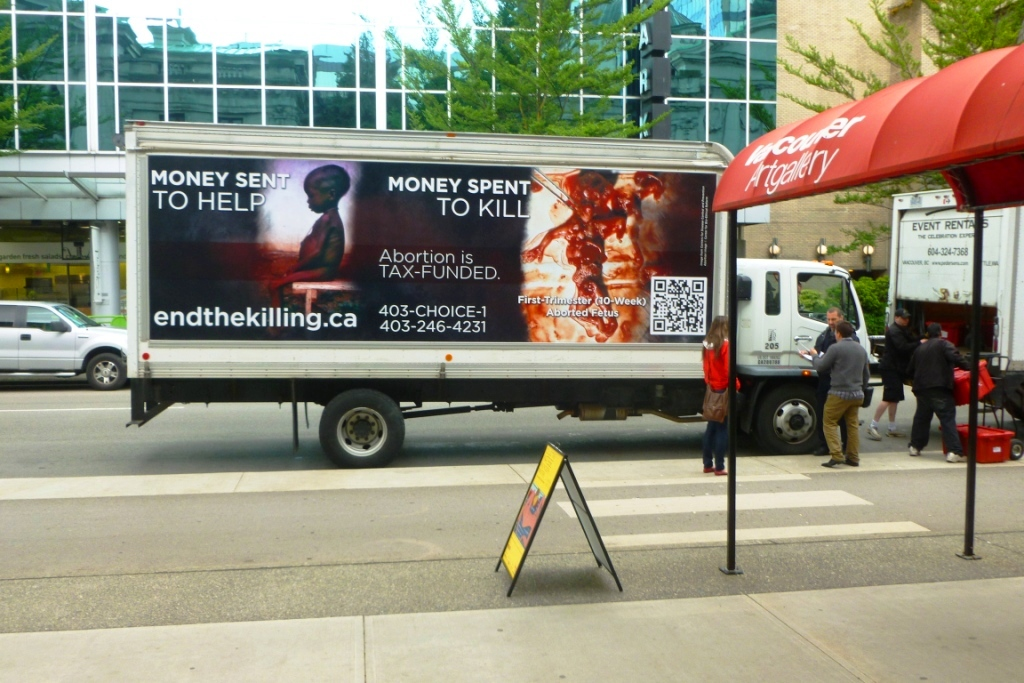
An anti-abortion advertisement on a truck in Vancouver in 2012

A Conservative MP, Cathay Wagantall, introduced a bill in 2020 seeking to ban abortions for the purpose of choosing a child's sex. Abortion in Canada is legal at all stages of pregnancy and funded in part by the Canada Health Act. In 2013, the Conservative prime minister, Stephen Harper, barred the members of Parliament from discussing the matter in the Commons. Harper's move was linked to his repeated declarations that he wouldn't allow the abortion debate to be re-opened. Since the 1980s, at least forty-three private member bills that are against abortion have been sent to the House of Commons yet none of them have been passed. Canadian anti-abortion discourse increasingly "aims at changing cultural values more than legislation; is explicitly framed as 'pro-woman'; largely avoids appealing to religious grounds; and relies on a new 'abortion-harms-women' argument that has supplanted and transformed traditional fetal personhood arguments".

Since 1998, Catholics and allies have held national anti-abortion March for Life rallies at Parliament Hill. Two have gathered over 10,000 protesters. In addition to the national protests, anti-abortionists protest abortion clinics across the nation in attempts to stop abortions from continuing.

== Australia ==
A number of anti-abortion organizations exist in Australia, including Cherish Life, Right to Life Australia, and Australian Christian Lobby. These organizations undertake various campaigning activities, including political campaign fundraising.

A large portion of Australian law surrounding abortion was originally derived from the British law. Until 1967, British law stated that "an induced abortion is unlawful in all situations save the (probable) exception of situations where it is necessary to save the life of the mother." Australia partook of this law until Britain changed it in 1967 towards a more liberal standpoint.

All states and territories, except Western Australia, have laws prohibiting anti-abortion campaigners from harassing visitors and staff of abortion clinics by setting exclusion zones around abortion clinics.

== Religion ==
=== Christianity ===
==== Evangelical Christianity ====
In Evangelical Christianity, international organizations like Focus on the Family are involved in the anti-abortion movement.

== See also ==
- 180 (2011 American film)
- Anti-abortion violence
- Crisis pregnancy center
- Dublin Declaration on Maternal Healthcare
- Fetal rights
- Forced abortion
- History of abortion law debate
- Mildred Fay Jefferson (founder of National Right to Life PAC)
- Unplanned (anti-abortion movie)
- World Federation of Doctors Who Respect Human Life
