= Theology of the Body =

Lecture series by Saint John Paul II

Theology of the Body is the topic of a series of 129 lectures given by Pope John Paul II during his Wednesday audiences in St. Peter's Square and the Paul VI Audience Hall between September 5, 1979, and November 28, 1984. It constitutes an analysis on human sexuality. The complete addresses were later compiled and expanded upon in many of John Paul's encyclicals, letters, and exhortations.

In Theology of the Body, John Paul II intends to establish an adequate anthropology in which the human body reveals God. He examines man and woman before the Fall, after it, and at the resurrection of the dead. He also contemplates the sexual complementarity of man and woman. He explores the nature of marriage, celibacy and virginity, and expands on the teachings in Humanae vitae on contraception. According to author Christopher West, the central thesis of John Paul's Theology of the Body is that "the body, and it alone, is capable of making visible what is invisible: the spiritual and the divine. It was created to transfer into the visible reality of the world, the mystery hidden since time immemorial in God, and thus to be a sign of it."

At present the Theology of the Body has been widely used and included in the curriculum of the Marriage Preparation Course in the Catholic dioceses of the United States.

== Preceding developments in the history of ideas ==
The series of addresses were given as a reflection on the creation of man as male and female, as a sexual being. They sought to respond to certain “distorted ideas and attitudes” as fundamental to the sexual revolution. Pope John Paul II addresses how the common understanding of the human body which analyzes it as a mechanism leads to objectification, that is, a loss of understanding of its intrinsic, personal meaning. Pope John Paul's thought is influenced by his earlier philosophical interests including the phenomenological approaches of Edmund Husserl and Max Scheler, and especially by the philosophical action theory of Thomas Aquinas which analyzes human acts in the context of what is done, freely chosen, and felt, while presupposing that those acts are made possible due to the substantial union of soul and matter as required by hylomorphism. Key pre-papal writings on these topics include Love and Responsibility, The Acting Person, and various papers collected in Person and Community. These themes are continued in John Paul II's theological anthropology, which analyzes the nature of human beings in relation to God. The Theology of the Body presents an interpretation of the fundamental significance of the body, and in particular of sexual differentiation and complementarity, one which aims to challenge common contemporary philosophical views. Nevertheless, the pope's personalistic phenomenology is "echoing what he learned from St. John of the Cross" and is "in harmony with St. Thomas Aquinas".

=== Francis Bacon ===
Francis Bacon was an early empiricist who focused on problems of knowledge. In his Great Instauration, he argued that the current state of knowledge is immature and not advancing. His purpose was for the human mind to have authority over nature through understanding and knowledge. Bacon argued against Aristotle's final and formal cause, stating that "the final cause rather corrupts than advances the sciences." He thought that focusing on formal causality is an impediment to knowledge, because power is gained by focusing on matter that is observable and experienced, not just a figment of the mind. His emphasis on power over nature contributed to the rise of an understanding of nature as mechanism and the claim that true knowledge of nature is that expressed by mechanical laws. Pope John Paul II saw Bacon's conception of knowledge and its proper object as the beginning of the split between person and body, which is his goal to reconcile.

=== René Descartes ===
René Descartes furthered a mathematical approach to philosophy and epistemology through skepticism and rationalism, emphasizing the practical value of power over nature. In his Discourse on Method, Descartes said, “we can find a practical [philosophy], by which knowing the nature and behavior of fire, water, air, stars, the heavens, and all the other bodies which surround us…we can employ these entities for all the purposes for which they are suited, and so make ourselves the masters and possessors of nature”. In addition to the importance of power over nature, Descartes (like Bacon) insisted upon dismissing final cause, stating that “the entire class of causes which people customarily derive from a thing’s ‘end,’ I judge to be utterly useless”.

Descartes’ practical philosophy also proposed a dualism between the mind and the physical body, based on the belief that they are two distinct substances. The body is matter that is spatially extended, whereas the mind is the substance that thinks and contains the rational soul. Pope John Paul II responded to this dualism in his Letter to Families in 1994: “It is typical of rationalism to make a radical contrast in man between spirit and body, between body and spirit. But man is a person in the unity of his body and his spirit. The body can never be reduced to mere matter”. Pope John Paul II maintained that the stark Cartesian opposition between body and spirit leads to human sexuality as an area for manipulation and exploitation, rather than wonder and unity as he addresses in the Theology of the Body lectures.

=== Immanuel Kant ===
Pope John Paul II admitted that the work of Immanuel Kant was the “starting ground” of many of his reflections. Kant, like Bacon and Descartes, believed that natural science can only progress through the mathematical-materialist determinist study of nature. However, Kant saw danger in those laws of nature if God is excluded because morality and religion are called into question. Kant's solution to that danger was to insist that theoretical reason is limited in regards to morality and religion. Reason and sense-data should not be used to try to answer the question of God. Kant stated, “I had to do away with knowledge to make room for faith”. That faith led to the development of Kant's personalism. In his Critique of Pure Reason, Kant said, “the conviction [of faith] is not a logical but a moral certainty; and because it rests on subjective bases (of the moral attitude), I must not even say, It is morally certain that there is a God, etc., but I must say, I am morally certain, etc." That ideology allows each person to choose their own terms for reality and morality, because they cannot be argued against using theoretical reason.

Kant's personalism extends from faith and applies to moral dignity, autonomy, and freedom. Pope John Paul II agreed with some aspects of personalism but criticized Kant as believing in “anti-trinitarian personalism,” which removes the relational character of the Trinity to focus on an autonomous self. Kant's views on the autonomous self placed each human's conscience acting as a personal “lawmaker” for subjective morality, but John Paul II argued that a human's conscience cannot create moral norms, rather it must discover them in objective truth.

The difference between Kant's view and Pope John Paul II's view of personalism is made clear throughout the Theology of the Body in arguments about sex, marriage, and polygamy. Kant had two principles of sexual ethics: that one must not “enjoy” another person solely for pleasure and that sexual union involves giving oneself to another. Pope John Paul II agreed on those principles, yet disagreed on the meaning and reasoning behind the principles. Kant believed that people lose their autonomy and dignity in sexual acts, because they are reduced to things being used for pleasure. Marriage resolves that by giving the spouses “lifelong mutual possession of their sexual characteristics”. However, Kant's explanation of marriage still does not transform the objectifying nature of sex, it merely permits it as legal. On the other hand, Pope John Paul II explains the sexual act in marriage as fulfillment of the natural law of spousal love. Rather than objectifying and depersonalizing, it is enriching for a person because it is a sincere gift of the self in love. Pope John Paul II highlights conjugal love, whereas Kant does not acknowledge it.

=== John of the Cross ===
Pope John Paul II's basic beliefs on love, when he was establishing his Theology of the Body, was derived from Saint John of the Cross (San Juan de la Cruz), a Spanish mystic and Doctor of the Church. Karol Wojtyla—before he became Pope John Paul II—defended his doctoral dissertation, later translated in a book titled Faith According to Saint John of the Cross, in June 1948 at the future Pontifical University of Saint Thomas Aquinas. In that work, John of the Cross's influence is shown in his belief that relationship with God is a unifying process in which its elements actuated dynamically. Other influence is that he values love over faith, and that love "draws the person into a real ontological and psychological union with God".

The "Sanjuanist triangle" of love consists of three points: 1) Love is self-giving; 2) Filial love to God and conjugal love in marriage are the self-giving paradigm; 3) Relationship between the Father, the Son, and the Holy Spirit within the Trinity is the model of self-giving love. Through pure love, a person experiences God in the "mutual exchange of self-donation".

Thomas Petri O.P. writes, "We may also note Wojtyla's observation that for John of the Cross, God is objective but not objectivizable to the intellect, which naturally lends itself to the personalistic norm that will eventually hold pride of place in Wojtyla's thought. Like the person of God, no human person can ever be a mere object of our actions but must be understood in relationship."

== Delivery ==
Theology of the Body is the topic of a series of 129 lectures given by Pope John Paul II during his Wednesday audiences in St. Peter's Square and the Paul VI Audience Hall between September 5, 1979 and November 28, 1984. It constitutes an analysis on human sexuality, and is considered as the first major teaching of his pontificate. Denis Read, O.C.D. says that, by means of the Theology of the Body, "John Paul II gave the Church the beginning of a mystical philosophy of life." The complete addresses were later compiled and expanded upon in many of John Paul's encyclicals, letters, and exhortations.

The delivery of the Theology of the Body series did have interruptions. For example, the Wednesday audiences were devoted to other topics during the Holy Year of Redemption in 1983.

== Topics ==
The work covers such topics as the unified corporeal and spiritual qualities of the human person; the origins, history and destiny of humanity; the deepest desires of the human heart and the way to experience true happiness and freedom; the truth about man's need and desire for loving communion derived from the revealed understanding of humanity in the image of a Triune Creator; the truth about God's original design for human sexuality and thus the dignity of the human person, how it was distorted through sin, and how it has been restored and renewed through the redemption of Jesus Christ; and Catholic teachings about the sacramentality of marriage.

The central thesis of John Paul's Theology of the Body, according to author Christopher West, is that "the body, and it alone, is capable of making visible what is invisible: the spiritual and the divine. It was created to transfer into the visible reality of the world, the mystery hidden since time immemorial in God, and thus to be a sign of it."

The work consists of two halves and five cycles. The first half, entitled "The Words of Christ" consists of three cycles in which John Paul II establishes an "adequate anthropology." Cycle 1 looks at the human person as we were created to be "in the beginning" (original man); Cycle 2 addresses human life after original sin, unredeemed and redeemed (historical man). Cycle 3 treats the reality of our life at the end of time when Christ comes back again and history reaches its fulfillment (eschatological man). John Paul II also places his reflections on virginity for the kingdom within the context of Cycle 3. In the second half, entitled "The Sacrament" (which refers to the sacrament of marriage), John Paul II addresses the sacramentality of marriage in Cycle 4 and the responsible transmission of human life in Cycle 5.

Some consider the very first encyclical of Pope Benedict XVI, Deus caritas est (God is Love), with its exposition of the relation between agape and eros, to be the culmination of John Paul II's Theology of the Body. For John Paul II's theology, eros has an inherent nuptial meaning but that its role is a sustaining theme for the body if logic is followed.

The Theology of the Body Papal Audiences
No.	Cycle	Title	Date
1	1	Of the Unity and Indissolubility of Marriage	September 5, 1979
2	1	Biblical Account of Creation Analysed	September 12, 1979
3	1	The Second Account of Creation: The Subjective Definition of Man	September 19, 1979
4	1	Boundary Between Original Innocence and Redemption	September 26, 1979
5	1	Meaning of Man's Original Solitude	October 10, 1979
6	1	Man's Awareness of Being a Person	October 24, 1979
7	1	In the Very Definition of Man, the Alternative Between Death and Immortality	October 31, 1979
8	1	Original Unity of Man and Woman	November 7, 1979
9	1	Man Becomes the Image of God by Communion of Persons	November 14, 1979
10	1	Marriage One and Indissoluble in First Chapters of Genesis	November 21, 1979
11	1	Meaning of Original Human Experiences	December 12, 1979
12	1	Fullness of Interpersonal Communication	December 19, 1979
13	1	Creation as a Fundamental and Original Gift	January 2, 1980
14	1	Revelation and Discovery of the Nuptial Meaning of the Body	January 9, 1980
15	1	The Man-Person Becomes a Gift in the Freedom of Love	January 16, 1980
16	1	Mystery of Man's Original Innocence	January 30, 1980
17	1	Man and Woman: A Mutual Gift for Each Other	February 6, 1980
18	1	Original Innocence and Man's Historical State	February 13, 1980
19	1	Man Enters the World as a Subject of Truth and Love	February 20, 1980
20	1	Analysis of Knowledge and of Procreation	March 5, 1980
21	1	Mystery of Woman Revealed in Motherhood	March 12, 1980
22	1	Knowledge-Generation Cycle and Perspective of Death	March 26, 1980
23	1	Marriage in the Integral Vision of Man	April 2, 1980
24	2	Christ Appeals to Man's Heart	April 16, 1980
25	2	Ethical and Anthropological Content of the Commandment: You Shall Not Commit Adultery	April 23, 1980
26	2	Lust is the Fruit of the Breach of the Covenant With God	April 30, 1980
27	2	Real Significance of Original Nakedness	May 14, 1980
28	2	A Fundamental Disquiet in All Human Existence	June 2, 1980
29	2	Relationship of Lust to Communion of Persons	June 4, 1980
30	2	Dominion Over the Other in the Interpersonal Relation	June 18, 1980
31	2	Lust Limits Nuptial Meaning of the Body	June 25, 1980
32	2	The Heart a Battlefield Between Love and Lust	July 23, 1980
33	2	Opposition in the Human Heart between the Spirit and the Body	July 30, 1980
34	2	Sermon on the Mount to the Men of Our Day	August 6, 1980
35	2	Content of the Commandment: You Shall Not Commit Adultery	August 13, 1980
36	2	Adultery According to the Law and as Spoken by the Prophets	August 20, 1980
37	2	Adultery: A Breakdown of the Personal Covenant	August 27, 1980
38	2	Meaning of Adultery Transferred from the Body to the Heart	September 3, 1980
39	2	Concupiscence as a Separation From Matrimonial Significance of the Body	September 10, 1980
40	2	Mutual Attraction Differs from Lust	September 17, 1980
41	2	Depersonalizing Effect of Concupiscence	September 24, 1980
42	2	Establishing the Ethical Sense	October 1, 1980
43	2	Interpreting the Concept of Concupiscence	October 8, 1980
44	2	Gospel Values and Duties of the Human Heart	October 15, 1980
45	2	Realization of the Value of the Body According to the Plan of the Creator	October 22, 1980
46	2	Power of Redeeming Completes Power of Creating	October 29, 1980
47	2	Eros and Ethos Meet and Bear Fruit in the Human Heart	November 5, 1980
48	2	Spontaneity: The Mature Result of Conscience	November 12, 1980
49	2	Christ Calls Us to Rediscover the Living Forms of the New Man	December 3, 1980
50	2	Purity of Heart	December 10, 1980
51	2	Justification in Christ	December 17, 1980
52	2	Opposition Between the Flesh and the Spirit	January 7, 1981
53	2	Life in the Spirit Based on True Freedom	January 14, 1981
54	2	St. Paul's Teaching on the Sanctity and Respect of the Human Body	January 28, 1981
55	2	St. Paul's Description of the Body and Teaching on Purity	February 4, 1981
56	2	The Virtue of Purity Is the Expression and Fruit of Life According to the Spirit	February 11, 1981
57	2	The Pauline Doctrine of Purity as Life According to the Spirit	March 18, 1981
58	2	Positive Function of Purity of Heart	April 1, 1981
59	2	Pronouncements of Magisterium Apply Christ's Words Today	April 8, 1981
60	2	The Human Body, Subject of Works of Art	April 15, 1981
61	2	Reflections on the Ethos of the Human Body in Works of Artistic Culture	April 22, 1981
62	2	Art Must Not Violate the Right to Privacy	April 29, 1981
63	2	Ethical Responsibilities in Art	May 6, 1981
64	3	Marriage and Celibacy in the Light of the Resurrection of the Body	November 11, 1981
65	3	The Living God Continually Renews the Very Reality of Life	November 18, 1981
66	3	The Resurrection and Theological Anthropology	December 2, 1981
67	3	The Resurrection Perfects the Person	December 9, 1981
68	3	Christ's Words on the Resurrection Complete the Revelation of the Body	December 16, 1981
69	3	New Threshold of Complete Truth About Man	January 13, 1982
70	3	Doctrine of the Resurrection according to St. Paul	January 27, 1982
71	3	The Risen Body Will Be Incorruptible, Glorious, Dynamic, and Spiritual	February 3, 1982
72	3	Body's Spiritualization Will Be Source of Its Power and Incorruptibility	February 10, 1982
73	4	Virginity or Celibacy for the Sake of the Kingdom	March 10, 1982
74	4	The Vocation to Continence in This Earthly Life	March 17, 1982
75	4	Continence for the Sake of the Kingdom Meant to Have Spiritual Fulfillment	March 24, 1982
76	4	The Effective and Privileged Way of Continence	March 31, 1982
77	4	Superiority of Continence Does Not Devalue Marriage	April 7, 1982
78	4	Marriage and Continence Complement Each Other	April 14, 1982
79	4	The Value of Continence Is Found in Love	April 21, 1982
80	4	Celibacy Is a Particular Response to the Love of the Divine Spouse	April 28, 1982
81	4	Celibacy for the Kingdom Affirms Marriage	May 5, 1982
82	4	Voluntary Continence Derives From a Counsel, Not From a Command	June 23, 1982
83	4	The Unmarried Person Is Anxious to Please the Lord	June 30, 1982
84	4	Everyone Has His Own Gift from God, Suited to His Vocation	July 7, 1982
85	4	The Kingdom of God, Not the World, Is Man's Eternal Destiny	July 14, 1982
86	4	Mystery of the Body's Redemption Basis of Teaching on Marriage and Voluntary Continence	July 21, 1982
87	5	Marital Love Reflects God's Love for His People	July 28, 1982
88	5	The Call to Be Imitators of God and to Walk in Love	August 4, 1982
89	5	Reverence for Christ the Basis of Relationship Between Spouses	August 11, 1982
90	5	A Deeper Understanding of the Church and Marriage	August 18, 1982
91	5	St Paul's Analogy of the Union of Head and Body	August 25, 1982
92	5	Sacredness of the Human Body and Marriage	September 1, 1982
93	5	Christ's Redemptive Love Has Spousal Nature	September 8, 1982
94	5	Moral Aspects of the Christian's Vocation	September 15, 1982
95	5	Relationship of Christ to the Church Connected With the Tradition of the Prophets	September 22, 1982
96	5	Analogy of Spousal Love Indicates the Radical Character of Grace	September 29, 1982
97	5	Marriage Is the Central Point of the Sacrament of Creation	October 6, 1982
98	5	Loss of Original Sacrament Restored with Redemption in Marriage-Sacrament	October 13, 1982
99	5	Marriage an Integral Part of New Sacramental Economy	October 20, 1982
100	5	Indissolubility of Sacrament of Marriage in Mystery of the Redemption of the Body	October 27, 1982
101	5	Christ Opened Marriage to the Saving Action of God	November 24, 1982
102	5	Marriage Sacrament an Effective Sign of God's Saving Power	December 1, 1982
103	5	The Redemptive and Spousal Dimensions of Love	December 15, 1982
104	5	The Substratum and Content of the Sacramental Sign of Spousal Communion	January 5, 1983
105	5	The Language of the Body in the Structure of Marriage	January 12, 1983
106	5	The Sacramental Covenant in the Dimension of Sign	January 19, 1983
107	5	Language of the Body Strengthens the Marriage Covenant	January 26, 1983
108	5	Man Called to Overcome Concupiscence	February 9, 1983
109	5	Return to the Subject of Human Love in the Divine Plan	May 23, 1984
110	5	Truth and Freedom the Foundation of True Love	May 30, 1984
111	5	Love Is Ever Seeking and Never Satisfied	June 6, 1984
112	5	Love Is Victorious in the Struggle Between Good and Evil	June 27, 1984
113	5	The Language of the Body: Actions and Duties Forming the Spirituality of Marriage	July 4, 1984
114	6	Morality of Marriage Act Determined by Nature of the Act and of the Subjects	July 11, 1984
115	6	The Norm of Humanae Vitae Arises from the Natural Law and the Revealed Order	July 18, 1984
116	6	Importance of Harmonizing Human Love with Respect for Life	July 25, 1984
117	6	Responsible Parenthood	August 1, 1984
118	6	Faithfulness to the Divine Plan in the Transmission of Life	August 8, 1984
119	6	Church's Position on Transmission of Life	August 22, 1984
120	6	A Discipline That Ennobles Human Love	August 28, 1984
121	6	Responsible Parenthood Linked to Moral Maturity	September 5, 1984
122	6	Prayer, Penance and the Eucharist: Principal Sources of Spirituality for Married Couples	October 3, 1984
123	6	The Power of Love Is Given to Man and Woman as a Share in God's Love	October 10, 1984
124	6	Continence Protects the Dignity of the Conjugal Act	October 24, 1984
125	6	Continence Frees One from Inner Tension	October 31, 1984
126	6	Continence Deepens Personal Communion	November 7, 1984
127	6	Christian Spirituality of Marriage by Living According to the Spirit	November 14, 1984
128	6	Respect for the Work of God	November 21, 1984
129	6	Conclusion to the Series: Redemption of the Body and Sacramentality of Marriage	November 28, 1984

=== Man and woman "in the beginning" ===
In this first cycle, beginning on September 5, 1979, Pope John Paul II discusses Christ's answer to the Pharisees when they ask him about whether a man can divorce his wife. Christ responds "He said to them: Because Moses by reason of the hardness of your heart permitted you to put away your wives: but from the beginning it was not so" (Matthew 19:8). John Paul II draws attention to how Christ's response calls the Pharisees to harken back to the beginning, to the created world before the fall of man and original sin. The pope dives into the experience of original man through the book of Genesis, and identifies two unique experiences: original solitude, and original unity. Original solitude is the experience of Adam, prior to Eve, when he realizes that through naming the animals there is something intrinsically different about himself. He is unable to find a suitable partner. This self-realization of a dignity before God higher than the rest of creation is original solitude. Original unity is drawn from man's first encounter with woman, where he exclaims "This now is bone of my bones, and flesh of my flesh; she shall be called woman, because she was taken out of man" (Genesis 2:23). Prior to the Fall, the pope accounts, man and woman's desire for one another was perfectly oriented in a Sacramental way that pointed them toward God's ultimate plan for humanity: the marriage of Christ the bridegroom with his bride the Church. Throughout Sacred Scripture, the most common reference that Christ uses when speaking of heaven is that of a wedding feast. Thus, marriage is intended to be a union that draws us deeper into the mystery of our creation and provides a foretaste of the heavenly marriage between Christ and his Church, where man and woman are no longer given in marriage. In heaven, the eternal wedding feast, men and women have now arrived at their ultimate destination and no longer have need of the Sacrament (or sign) of marriage.

=== Man and woman after the Fall ===
This second cycle focuses on Christ's remarks on adultery in the Sermon on the Mount (Matthew 5:27–28):

You have heard that it was said to them of old: Thou shalt not commit adultery. But I say to you, that whosoever shall look on a woman to lust after her, hath already committed adultery with her in his heart.

Pope John Paul II explains this as looking at another person, even at his/her own partner, to desire them in a reductive way, that is they are viewed as merely an object of desire. Pope John Paul II says this seems to be a key passage for theology of the body.

=== Man and woman after the Resurrection of the Dead ===
The third cycle analyzes Christ's answer to the Sadducees when they come to him and ask about a woman who had married seven brothers in succession. It explores Christ's response to the Sadducees regarding the resurrection. The Sadducees, who denied the resurrection, posed a question to Jesus about the woman, asking whose wife she would be in the resurrection (cf. Matthew 22:23–33; Mark 12:18–27; Luke 20:27–40). Christ replied that “in the resurrection they neither marry nor are given in marriage, but are like angels in heaven” (Matthew 22:30). John Paul interpreted this passage as offering insights into the destiny of human sexuality, marriage, and the human body. According to him, Christ’s answer does not negate the value of marriage, but rather points to its fulfillment and transformation in the eschatological state—that is, after the resurrection of the dead.

=== Celibacy and virginity ===
The fourth cycle is a meditation on celibacy and virginity.

Pope John Paul II stated that continence for the sake of the Kingdom is not opposed to marriage. He noted that when arguing with the Pharisees about whether is it licit to divorce and Jesus' disciples inferred that it was better not to marry, Jesus did not address whether it was expedient or not to marry, but pointed out that there are "eunuchs" and some are so willingly for the sake of the kingdom of heaven.

=== Sacrament of marriage ===
The fifth cycle discusses the sacrament of marriage.

=== Contraception ===
Pope John Paul II began his discussion of contraception on 11 July 1984 with the 114th lecture in this series. This section of the lecture series, the sixth and final part, is largely a reflection on Humanae vitae, the 1968 encyclical of Pope Paul VI. In it, John Paul continued his emphasis on the design of the human body revealing God's truths. It is explained and reaffirmed that the fundamental structure of males and females, which causes sexual intercourse between them to result in both greater intimacy and the capability of generating new life, demonstrates a morally inseparable connection between these two functions.

The authority of the Magisterium (teaching authority of the Church and those who hold the office) to interpret the divine intention (in this context, through the structure of the body), is emphasized. Although not all of the Church's teachings on sexuality are present in a literal reading of the biblical text, John Paul gives examples of how they are part of longstanding Church tradition — a tradition that was created in the context of scriptural teachings.

The ability of the human body to express truth through the sexual union of married couples is acclaimed. The moral wrongness of using artificial means to manipulate such a significant aspect of the created body is explained. Dominion over outside forces, and also self-mastery through discipline, are integral human drives. However, the language expressed by bodies, in this context the language expressed during sexual intercourse, is so damaged by the use of artificial contraception that the conjugal act "ceases to be an act of love... [or] communion of persons" but rather is a mere bodily union.

On the other hand, the licitness of natural family planning (NFP) methods is held to be evident from the structure of the human body, which has natural periods of fertility and infertility. The morality of these methods was literally designed into the body, and use of them, unlike use of artificial contraception, can actually improve the dialog between couples which is expressed through the language of the body. Throughout these speeches the main emphasis is on the intrinsic goodness of the marital act. The power of love between spouses is said to both lead to and be nourished by the moral use of the conjugal act. Thus, moral exercise of sexual intercourse uses the form of the body to reveal the love of God toward Creation.

While following the rules of NFP does not guarantee a truly spiritual sexual relationship between husband and wife, understanding the theology that makes NFP acceptable can foster the maturity needed by the couple to attain that level of spirituality, living life by the Holy Spirit. Also, Pope John Paul II warns couples against "lowering the number of births in their family below the morally correct level." Responsible parenthood is greatly encouraged, however it is emphasized that while this sometimes means limiting family size, responsible parenthood can also mandate couples to increase their family size. This is because of the good that children bring not only to their immediate family, but also to their society and Church.

The seriousness of a couple's decision to maintain or increase their family size is discussed. John Paul refers to Gaudium et spes, a document issued by the Second Vatican Council, which emphasizes the importance of couples' having their conscience guided by the law of God. The difficulty inherent in and endurance required to consciously regulate births with these methods is discussed, although largely in the context of the integral part played by the burdens of life as Christians follow the "hard way" through the "narrow gate". In fact, the kind of discipline necessary to practice periodic continence is claimed to impart licit conjugal acts with deeper meaning, as well as bringing out the ability of a married couple to express love through non-sexual acts.

John Paul states many other benefits claimed for moral use of NFP, some from Humanae vitae. These include an increase of marital peace, less spousal selfishness, increased and more positive influence over their children (5 September 1984), and increased dignity of person through following the law of God. Use of NFP is also said to increase appreciation of children, by fostering respect for what is created by God.

== Assessments ==
=== By Pope John Paul II ===
Pope John Paul II's last book, Memory and Identity, mentions the importance of the Thomistic philosophy and theology of the prominent doctor of the Catholic Church St. Thomas Aquinas to come to a deeper understanding of the Pope's personalist (phenomenological) presentation of Humanae vitae in his Theology of the Body catechesis, since he saw the limitations of a strictly phenomenological approach. He wrote:

If we wish to speak rationally about good and evil, we have to return to St. Thomas Aquinas, that is, to the philosophy of being. With the phenomenological method, for example, we can study experiences of morality, religion, or simply what it is to be human, and draw from them a significant enrichment of our knowledge. Yet we must not forget that all these analyses implicitly presuppose the reality of the Absolute Being and also the reality of being human, that is, being a creature. If we do not set out from such 'realist' presuppositions, we end up in a vacuum.

=== By George Weigel ===
George Weigel has described Theology of the Body as "one of the boldest reconfigurations of Catholic theology in centuries." He goes on to say it is a "kind of theological time bomb set to go off with dramatic consequences, sometime in the third millennium of the Church." Weigel believes that it has barely begun to "shape the Church's theology, preaching, and religious education" but when it does "it will compel a dramatic development of thinking about virtually every major theme in the Creed."

Weigel also realizes major obstacles to the theology of the body. The Pope is very hard to read and understand: "The density of John Paul's material is one factor. A secondary literature capable of translating John Paul's thought into accessible categories and vocabulary is badly needed." And, Weigel believes, the dominant liberal views on such issues as women's rights, birth control, abortion and divorce are also obstacles to the "theology of the body" becoming known or accepted.

Many of Weigel's concerns with respect to being able to understand the set of Wednesday General Audiences on the Theology of the Body have been addressed in the new translation, Man and Woman He Created Them: A Theology of the Body (2006, Michael Waldstein, translator). One of the drawbacks of the prior English-language versions is that different translators were used at varying times over the long period that the Audience talks were given. Hence, it happened occasionally that the same term would be translated differently from one talk to the other. The new translation has corrected that problem in addition to being confirmed by having had access to John Paul's original notes in Polish, rather than merely the Italian used in the Audience talks.

=== By Christopher West ===
In his Theology of the Body Explained Christopher West, who has been teaching John Paul's theology of the body since the late 1990s, wrote, "John Paul's TOB is most often cast as an extended catechesis on marriage and sexual love. It certainly is that, but it is also so much more. Through the mystery of the Incarnate person and the biblical analogy of spousal love, John Paul II's catechesis illumines the entirety of God's plan for human life from origin to eschaton with a splendid supernatural light."

Philosopher-theologian Alice von Hildebrand, widow of 20th century philosopher-theologian Dietrich von Hildebrand, stated that West "misunderstood the authentic Catholic tradition", promotes a "hyper-sexualized approach", "puts too much emphasis on the body in a culture in which everything is body-centered", has an "infatuation with pop culture and rock and roll" which "is a long way from the austere spirit of the New Testament", and uses "loose language". Alice cited Dr David Schindler's "critique of West" that West used "phallic symbolism to describe the Easter candle". Alice contrasts West and Dietrich.

=== By John Cornwell ===
In his account of the reign of John Paul II, author John Cornwell says of the Theology of the Body: "This work, which constitutes, in the view of some keen papal supporters, John Paul's vital legacy to the world, has been perhaps his least influential."

=== By Charles Curran ===
Dissident Catholic moral theologian Charles E. Curran, writing in his book The Moral Theology of Pope John Paul II, says the pope's Wednesday audiences are unlikely to have been understood by many of those present at the time: "Quite frankly, the talks do not seem appropriate for the occasion. They are somewhat theoretical and too detailed for a general audience. In addition, because each individual talk is part of a larger whole, it is difficult to understand the full meaning of any short talk without seeing the whole picture. I am sure that most of those in attendance at the audiences did not follow what the pope was saying." Curran also makes the point that such talks have "little or no importance from the viewpoint of authoritative teaching," and that the pope appears to be unaware of contemporary biblical scholarship and makes no mention of any contemporary scholars of any type.

Curran also believes the Theology of the Body "clearly cannot serve as a theology for all persons and all bodies", and that "there are many people for whom the 'nuptial meaning' of the body he develops are not appropriate. As with many utopias, the elderly are missing. But also most obviously the unmarried - people who are single, people who are widowed, and homosexuals. The pope at one point tries to show how virginity and celibacy can be understood within the terms of his ideas about the 'nuptial meaning' of the body, but these arguments are unconvincing." On the positive side, Curran says the pope "strongly supports the equality of men and women in marriage and expressly opposes any subordination of the woman to the man."

Thomas Petri, O.P. says, "Charles Curran can be excused for his criticism to the contrary since it was made before the publication of Waldstein's translation."

=== By Kenneth L. Woodward ===
The religion editor for Newsweek, Kenneth L. Woodward, has described John Paul's Theology of the Body as "a highly romantic and unrealistic view of human sexuality".

=== By Sebastian Moore, OSB ===
Benedictine Sebastian Moore, a controversial Catholic moral theologian who often criticizes some Catholic teachings, expresses his disagreement openly with the Theology of the Body. Moore criticizes what he regards as a lack of connection to real people in their real lives. Specifically he notes that while the pope reflects on the essential incompleteness of the body in its maleness and femaleness and on the mystery of the union of two in one flesh, he does not talk specifically about the various concrete experiences of the sexual act itself. Moore also argues that in his protracted discussion of the "shame" of Adam and Eve in the Garden of Eden when they become aware of their nakedness, the pope fundamentally misunderstands what the story is saying. In the Genesis account, according to Moore, "it is shame that sets the stage for lust", but "in the pope's account, it is the other way round: lust generates shame."

=== By Georg Schelbert ===
Theologian Georg Schelbert, of the University of Fribourg in Switzerland, is critical of the Theology of the Body for its highly selective use of Scripture. Schelbert argues that it is clear that the biblical stories of the patriarchs in the Old Testament clearly permit polygamy, in contradiction of John Paul's statement that polygamy "directly rejects the plan of God as revealed in the beginning." He also notes that, in John Paul's discussion of divorce, "not a single word is said about the so-called Pauline privilege (or about the extension of that privilege, which for a long time was falsely called 'Petrine') which relaxes these rigorous conclusions".

== See also ==
- New feminism
- Religion and sexuality#Christianity
- Male and female he created them: toward a path of dialogue on the question of gender identity in education
- Christian naturism#Vatican
