= Długosz House (Kraków) =

Historic building in Kraków's Old Town

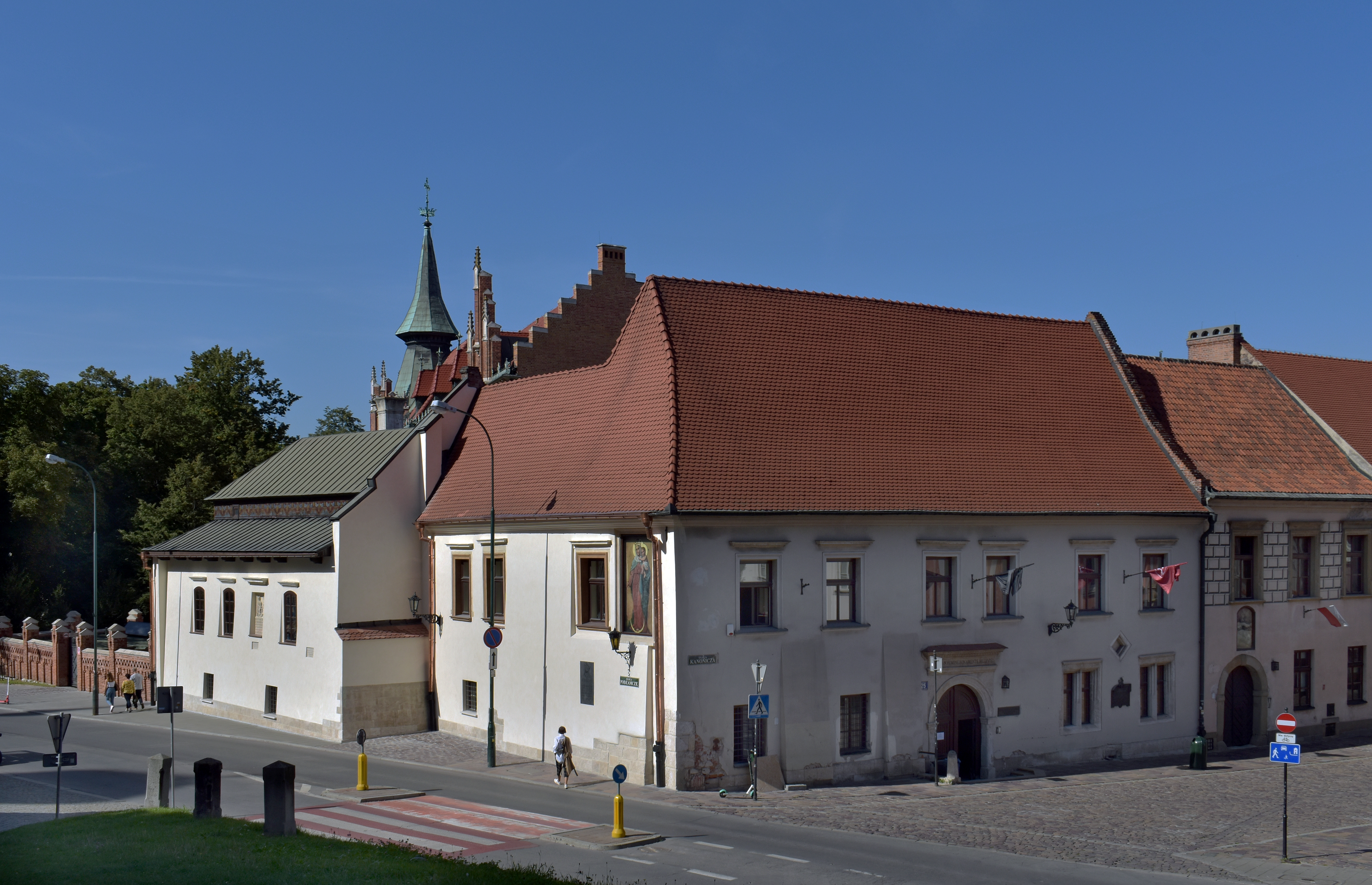
- View from Wawel Castle
- Interactive map of the Długosz House area

General information
- Location: Kraków, 25 Kanonicza Street; 6 Podzamcze Street, Poland
- Coordinates: 50°03′20″N 19°56′12″E

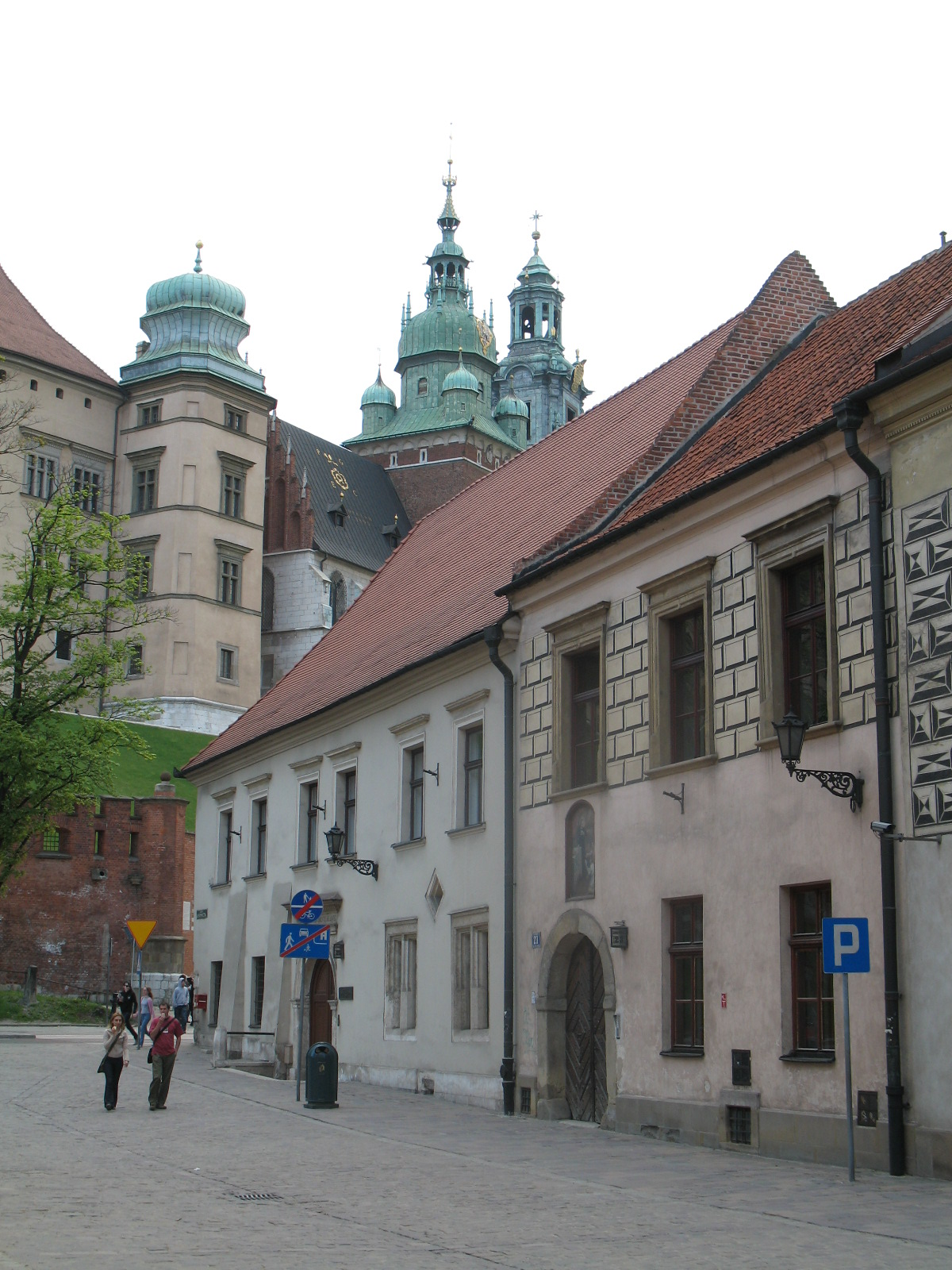
Długosz House (left) in the frontage of Kanonicza Street

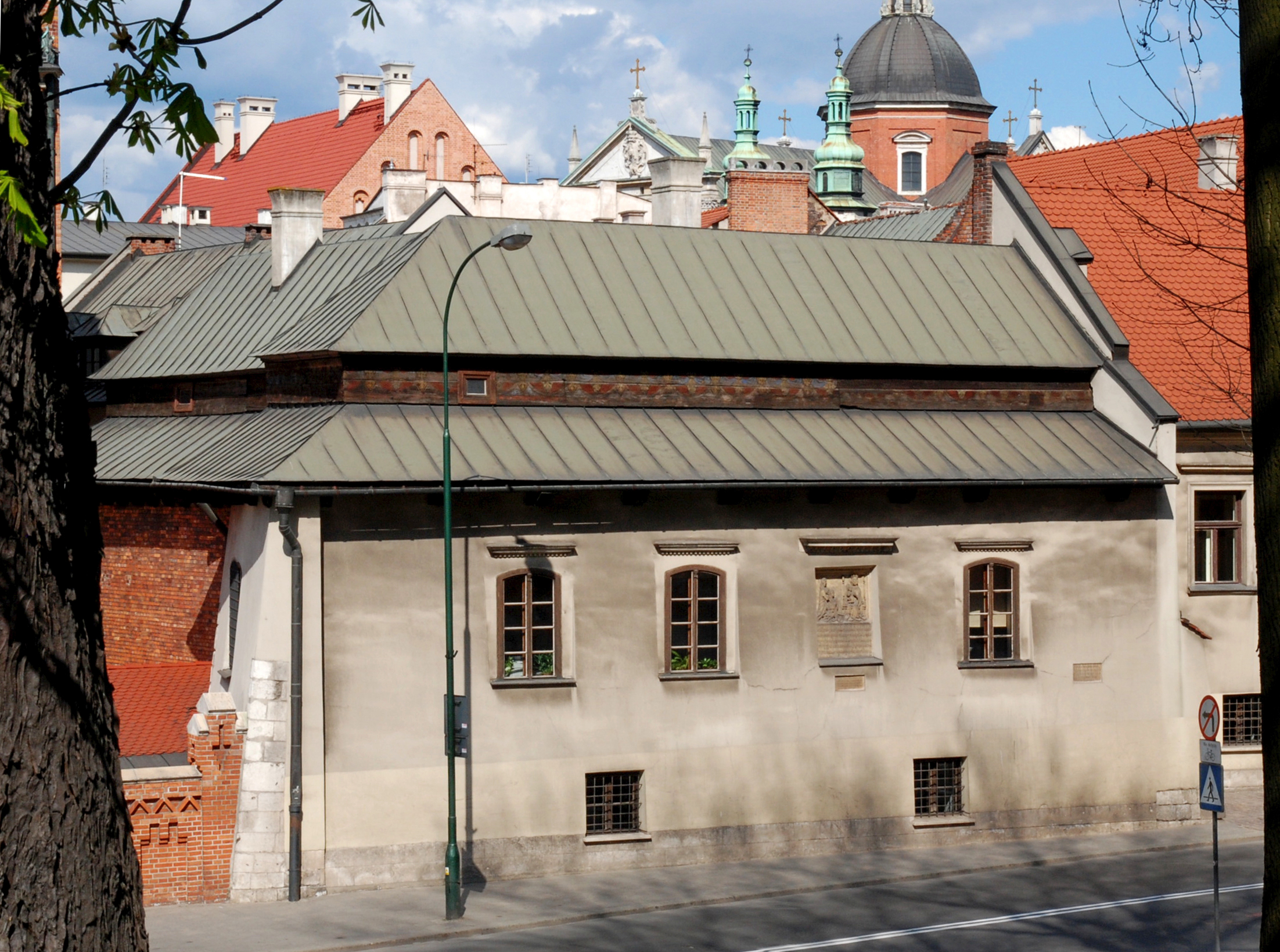
South wing of the house, added by Długosz

Długosz House is a historic building in Kraków's Old Town, located at 25 Kanonicza Street, at the corner with Podzamcze Street, at the foot of Wawel hill. Erected in the 14th century, it housed a royal bathhouse. It was repeatedly rebuilt and transformed. Since the first half of the 15th century, it served as a residential house for cathedral canons, and it owes its name to one of them – Jan Długosz. It was not until the 19th century that its purpose changed, and during this century, Stanisław Wyspiański lived there. Currently, it serves as the seat of the rectorate of the Pontifical University of John Paul II.

== History ==
=== Royal bathhouse ===
The masonry building, which constitutes the oldest part of the preserved structure, was erected in the first half of the 14th century. Located near the Wawel Castle, it neighbored the Side Gate. By the end of that century, it served as a royal bathhouse, (Note: It is reported that Jagiełło likely invited Zawisza Czerwony to this bathhouse, as an emissary of Jadwiga, so that he could fully examine its appearance and report back to the queen (Polkowski (1880, p. 3), Tomkowicz (1985, p. 154), Adamczewski (2003, p. 567)). However, linking this event to Kraków is mistaken, as Zawisza met the grand duke in Sandomierz, according to Rożek (2012, pp. 259–260).) supplied with water from the Młynówka Królewska stream – an artificial watercourse flowing along today's Podzamcze Street, encircling the building from the south and west.

=== Noble residence ===
Most likely due to the gradual drying up of the Rudawka stream, maintaining the bathhouse at this location became impractical. In 1390, on August 9th, King Władysław Jagiełło gifted the building to Krystyn of Ostrów, who established his residence there. He expanded the acquired house by adding the adjacent one, purchased from the townsman Tomek, known as Lewek, and his wife Morzka. Additionally, in 1408, he acquired a brick kitchen from the Archbishop of Gniezno, Mikołaj Kurowski. This kitchen was situated outside the city fortifications, so during the adaptation works, it was necessary to incorporate the defensive wall into the house (various parts of the residence were attached to it), thus rendering it devoid of its military function. This was the first instance in Kraków of attaching fortifications to a townhouse.

=== Chapter house ===
In 1413, with the consent and royal confirmation in a document dated August 25th, Krystyn transferred the building to the cathedral chapter in exchange for tithes from the villages of Kamyk and Sławkowice, granted by Bishop Wojciech Jastrzębiec from his own estates, for the endowment of the altar of Hedwig of Silesia, founded by the nobleman in the Wawel Cathedral. Henceforth, the building, known as the chapter house, was to serve as accommodation for the canons. It was given to Mikołaj Hinczowic of Kazimierz and Jan of Rudzica, who in either 1415 or 1430 carried out extensive renovations at considerable expense. The building, previously referred to as the "castle bathhouse" or "royal bathhouse", was henceforth known as the "House of Hińczy". Additionally, successive canons residing there annually paid two grzywnas for the anniversary, a commemorative mass for Mikołaj.

=== Długosz House ===
The house, vacant after the death of Jan of Radochońce, was transferred to Jan Długosz by the chapter's decision on 4 February 1450. Perhaps Jan Elgot, his relative, contributed to making this decision. (Note: Elgot was supposed to be Długosz's uncle, as presented by Pieradzka (1975, pp. 32, 115). However, Maria Koczerska rejected this interpretation, arguing that the sources do not allow for such a precise determination of the degree of kinship (Polak (1999, p. 47)).) The canon initially lived alone, with the chapter's custodian also entitled to use the house whenever he was in Kraków. In 1453, Długosz was joined by his namesake brother. (Note: The situation where two canons lived in one building was quite common in the Middle Ages, especially when the Kraków chapter had fewer houses than its members. Moreover, it happened that not all of the owned properties were suitable for habitation (Kowalski (2000, p. 247)).) The building proved too small for the two permanent residents, so a year later, renovations were carried out. A second floor was added to the existing house, and two-story wings were added to the south and west, connected at an angle to form an L-shape. From then on, the entire complex formed a horseshoe with a courtyard in the middle.

The fire of 1455 spared this tenement, unlike most of the buildings on Kanonicza Street, which burned down. (Note: Sometimes it is stated that it was the only building on Kanoniczna Street that did not fall victim to the flames, as mentioned by Stachowski (2000, p. 156). However, Długosz himself noted in his chronicle that the house of the chapter's cantor, Mikołaj Spicmer, also survived (Długosz, Mrukówna & Wyrozumski (2004, p. 264)).) In June 1461, the Długosz brothers had to leave the house as they were banished, like many supporters of Jakub of Sienno, during the dispute between the chapter and King Casimir IV Jagiellon over the appointment of the Kraków bishopric. Their residence on Kanonicza, during the tumult in which Andrzej Tęczyński was killed on July 16, became a place of brief refuge for the murdered man's son, Jan Rabsztyński, who was also threatened with death. He reached there through the back of the Franciscan monastery, and from this building, he managed to make his way to the royal castle. The house of the proscribed brothers was plundered later that same year by the Kurozwęcki brothers, Stanisław and Dobiesław, acting with the king's consent (December 19). (Note: Such a solution to the date recorded by Długosz – "the Monday before Saint Thomas" – is contained in the latest Polish translation of his work. Another date, December 21st, is provided by Perzanowska & Gawęda (1980, p. 322). Completely erroneous dating of this event (25 December 1460) is mentioned by Grzybowski (2003, p. 29).) The Długosz brothers returned to Kraków in 1463, receiving ten grzywnas from the chapter for the repair of the building at that time.

In the following years, the younger of the brothers occupied the eastern wing of the house, facing Kanonicza Street. Meanwhile, Jan Długosz the elder resided in the newly added section, where he worked on his works, Annales seu cronicae incliti Regni Poloniae (from 1455) and Liber beneficiorum dioecesis Cracoviensis (from 1470). Perhaps it was also one of the places where he imparted knowledge to the sons of Casimir Jagiellon, whom he tutored starting from 1467. After his brother's death in 1471, he shared the building with Jakub of Szadek, a professor at the Jagiellonian University whom he knew well. In 1479, Długosz received a nomination as the Archbishop of Lviv and resigned from his canonry, yet he continued to reside in the chapter house. It was there that he died on 19 May 1480. Immediately after Długosz's death, Jakub of Szadek took over the house, and after some time, he was joined by Grzegorz Lubrański. (Note: On 2 June 1480, Jakub contributed twenty grzywnas to the chapter (Perzanowska & Gawęda (1980, p. 364)). This sum, along with the obligation to pay an identical amount at a later time, was interpreted as payment for the right to occupy the house independently (Polkowski (1880, p. 10), Bąkowski (1897, p. 9) and Pieradzka (1975, p. 84)). However, recent research does not confirm this, indicating a cohabitant with Szadek instead. Meanwhile, his payments were considered a fee, an amount assessed for the house, which each canon paid upon taking over the building (Kowalski (2000, pp. 242–243)).)

=== Early modern times ===
Among the subsequent canons who resided in the building, a notable figure was Maciej Miechowita, a professor and rector of the university, author of the Chronica Polonorum, a continuation of Długosz's chronicle. Miechowita lived there for a while, from 1514, sharing the residence with Maciej Drzewicki. He embellished the house, where he amassed a sizable library and a collection of works of artistic craftsmanship, coins, scientific and musical instruments, maps, and paintings.

Władysław Łuszczkiewicz associated the renovations of the building with the time of Miechowita (and the canons who occupied the house immediately after him), during which Renaissance elements were introduced, such as cornices above the windows or the portal of the main gate from Kanonicza Street, (Note: This entrance was not to be knocked down until the 16th century, when the gate on the Wawel side was bricked up, according to Pieradzka (1975, pp. 83, 85).) adorned with a Latin inscription. Although it is generally accepted that reconstruction took place at the beginning of the 16th century, the portal is dated to the second half of that century. Then, in 1571, renovations were carried out on the premises. The external walls were reinforced with buttresses, new window frames were installed, the interiors were decorated with paintings, a kitchen was arranged, and a new bathroom was built. The next renovation took place only in 1775 and included the galleries on the courtyard side and the replacement of the roof. It is possible that it was related to the repairs after the damage caused during the Bar Confederation conflicts.

After the Third Partition of Poland and the incorporation of Kraków into Austria by imperial decree in 1797, the chapter was deprived of most of the buildings on Kanonicza Street. Only eight buildings remained in its possession, including Długosz House, which continued to serve residential purposes. In 1825, it was placed under the administration of the chapter's procuratorship, but already the following year Canon Ludwik Łętowski moved into the building. Finally, in 1839, the house was designated as the seat of the procuratorship, which was located in the eastern wing on Kanonicza Street. Subsequently, it housed successive deputy procurators and chapter notaries.

=== Wyspiański's house ===
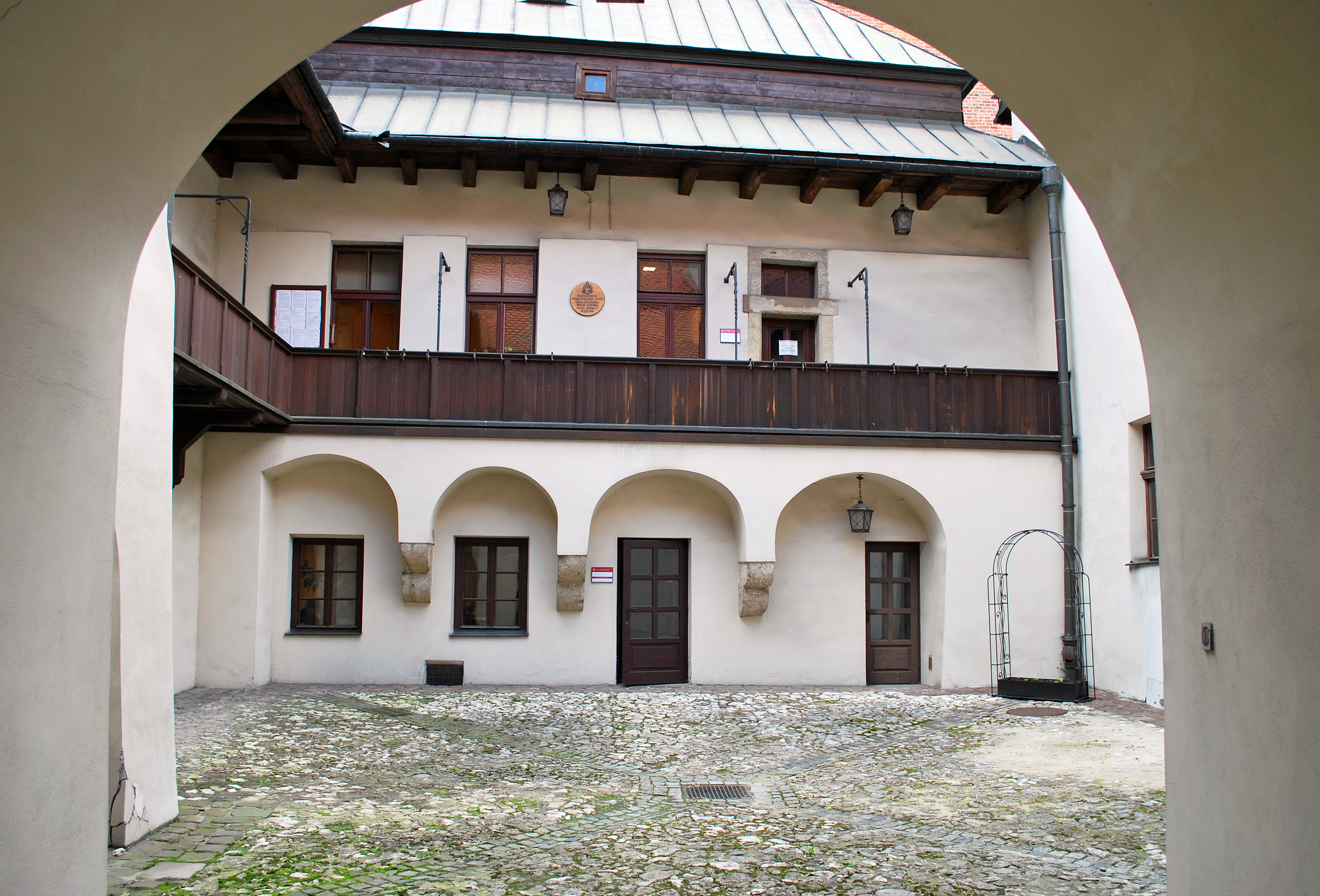
Courtyard. Stanisław Wyspiański's father had a studio in this house.

Thirty-four years later (1873), Franciszek Wyspiański rented part of the building. It consisted of three rooms on the ground floor, in the southwest corner. Before moving in with his wife Maria and two sons, the sculptor had to carry out renovations, combined with adaptation for residential purposes. In the large, barrel-vaulted chamber in the southern wing, which had previously served as a coach house, he set up his studio, while in the western wing, he converted two rooms (former stables) into a bedroom for his wife and a kitchen. Some sources suggest that the residential function was fulfilled by a wooden, single-story cottage located near Długosz House (or in its annex), which was connected to it by Wyspiański.

The living conditions were quite typical for a significant part of Kraków's contemporary buildings – water available only from wells, lack of sanitary facilities, difficulties with heating the rooms. Over time, the inconveniences began to affect the Wyspiański family, especially the small size of the living area, so Franciszek divided his studio in half with a curtain, keeping one part for himself and allocating the other part for students and as a place to gather materials for work. Długosz House, after a successful period in the artist's life, became a place of creative crisis, alcoholism, depression, and family tragedies – the sudden death of his younger son, Tadeusz (1875), his wife's illness with tuberculosis, and her death (1876). His mother and sister tried to help Wyspiański run the household, moving in while Maria was still alive, which, however, increased the cramped living conditions. After four years (1880), the older son, Stanisław, left, passing under the care of his uncle and aunt, the Stankiewiczes. In the same year, the sculptor also moved from Długosz House to a building on Kopernik Street.

Living in the immediate vicinity of Wawel, with a magnificent view of the historic complex of the hill, strongly influenced Stanisław Wyspiański's later work, as did the time spent with his father in his studio, which was also a place for playing with school friends, as recalled later by Stanisław Estreicher and Henryk Opieński. The artist dedicated a poem to this place and the role it played in his life, written in 1903 under the title At the Foot of Wawel, my father had a studio...

=== Anniversary of Długosz's death ===
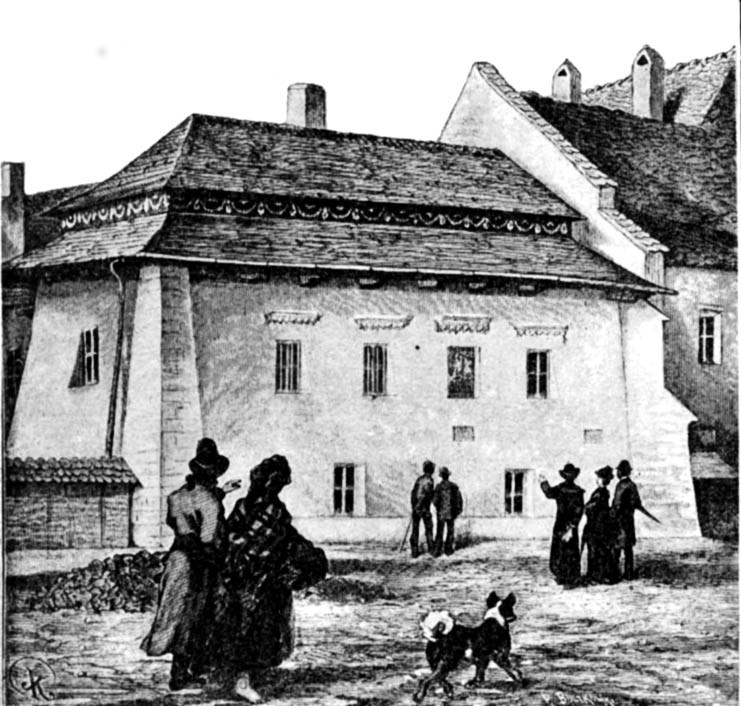
Długosz House, according to an 1880 drawing by Juliusz Kossak

The four-hundredth anniversary of the chronicler's death in 1880 aroused interest in the building, then still rarely referred to as "Długosz House", more often as "Under the Madonna", from the image on the facade. Texts discussing its history appeared. In connection with the anniversary celebrations, the chapter renewed the building and also decided to commemorate the chronicler in this place. During the First Congress of Polish Historians (May 18–21, 1880), a stone, fifteenth-century commemorative plaque from the demolished Psalterists' house (Psalterium), founded by Długosz, was embedded in the facade of the southern wing, facing Wawel. (Note: The year 1876, as the date of the transfer of this plaque, is given by: Stachowski (2000, p. 156), Rożek (2000, p. 320).) In the same year, on July 12, the chapter and the conservator of monuments, Józef Łepkowski, placed an additional plaque there, commemorating the fact that the greatest Polish chronicler of the late Middle Ages lived and worked in this building. The interest in the historic house, which persisted after 1880, was manifested in the depiction of its views, in drawings or photographs. In this way, the building gained a rich iconographic documentation.

=== From the late 19th century ===
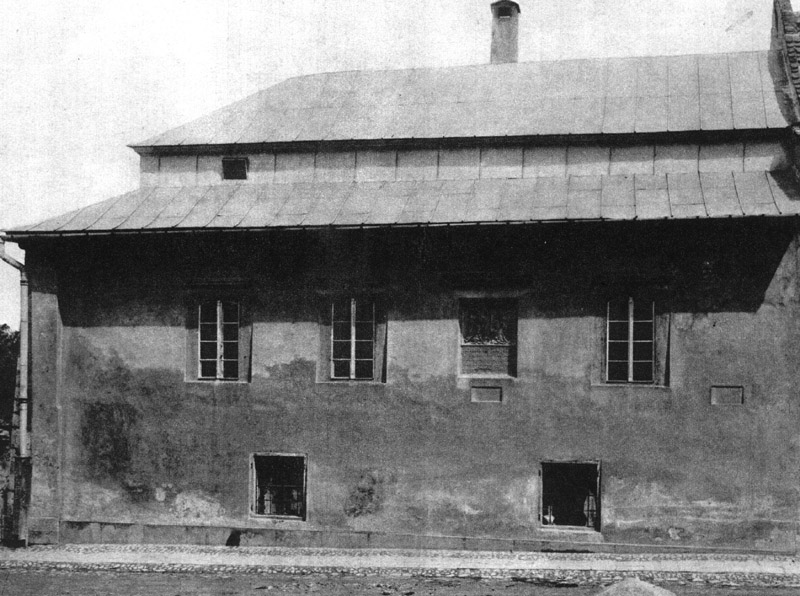
The southern wing of the Długosz House, captured from the Podzamcze side. In the ground floor windows, sculptures by Franciszek Wyspiański can be seen. At the level of the first-floor windows, there is the foundation plaque of the Psalterium. The photo dates back to around 1880, taken at Ignacy Krieger's workshop.

Until his death in 1900, Professor Władysław Ignacy Wisłocki, the custodian of the Jagiellonian Library, lived in Długosz House with his family. At the end of the 19th century, the chapter relinquished the building to the episcopal curia. In 1900, a neo-Gothic building for the seminary of the diocese was erected at the back of the house, in place of the garden. This marked the biggest changes in the interior of Długosz House, which was adapted for the needs of the curia and the seminary's economic facilities (a kitchen was arranged in its annex). A renovation of the building took place in 1906.

The interwar period brought plans to change the purpose of the building. In 1927, the CEO of Radio Kraków, Bronisław Winiarz, proposed to establish a museum dedicated to Stanisław Wyspiański there as a branch of the National Museum. However, this idea was not implemented at that time, just as it was in 1932 when it was reconsidered.

In the second half of the 20th century, historical documentation of Długosz House was developed based on earlier literature and archival materials (Andrzej Fischinger, 1966), and architectural research was also conducted to determine the successive phases of its construction (Waldemar Niewalda and Jerzy Kossowski, 1969). After 1980, renovation work on the building began, and there was once again a proposal to establish a museum there, this time dedicated to Franciszek Wyspiański. The comprehensive restoration of the house was completed in the 1990s, with major work completed by 1990. In 1991, the building was handed over to the then-Academy of Theology, and it was consecrated by Pope John Paul II. The university's rectorate is located there.

== Building ==
Details from the facade of Długosz House

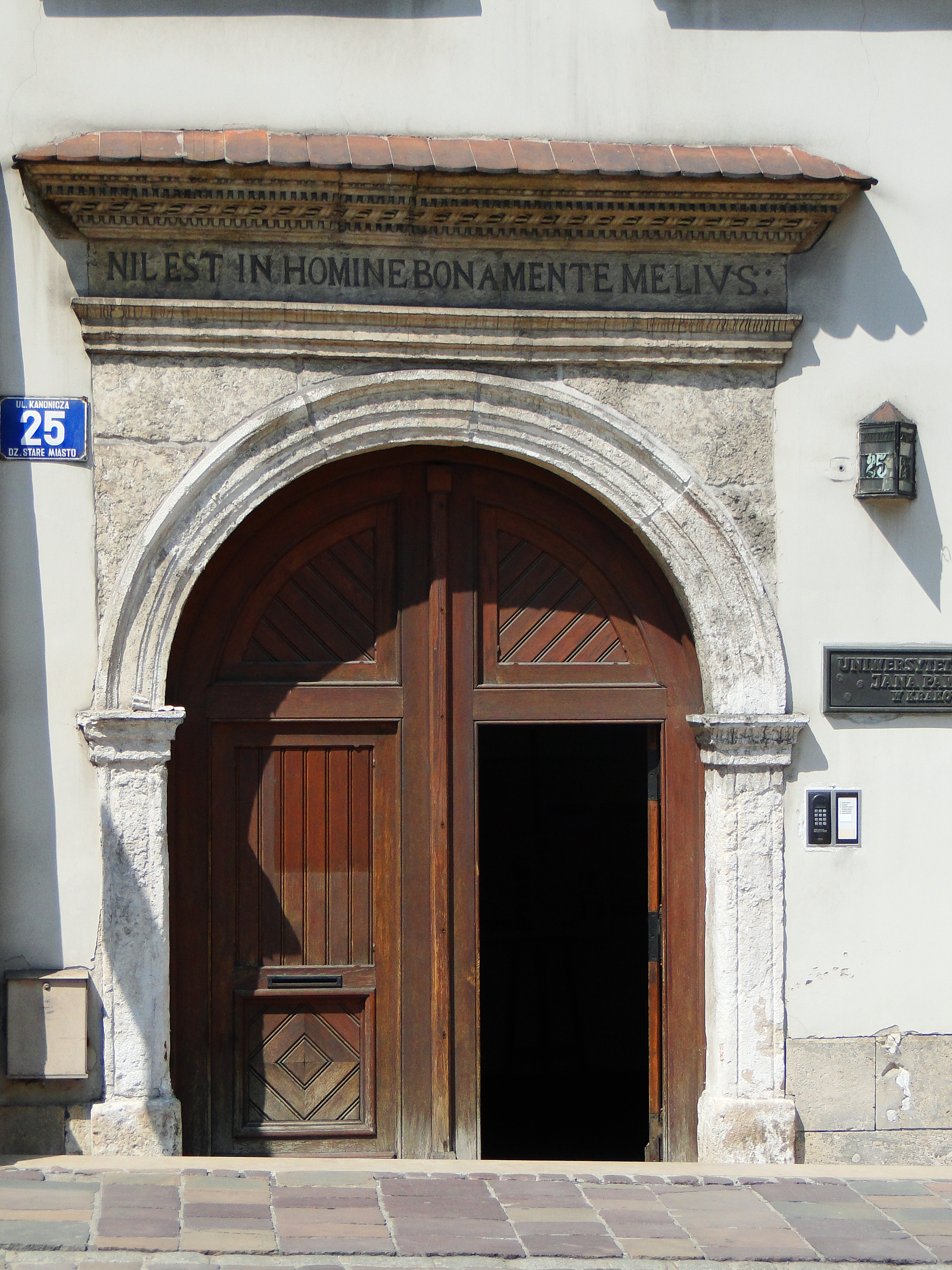
Renaissance portal from the second half of the 16th century

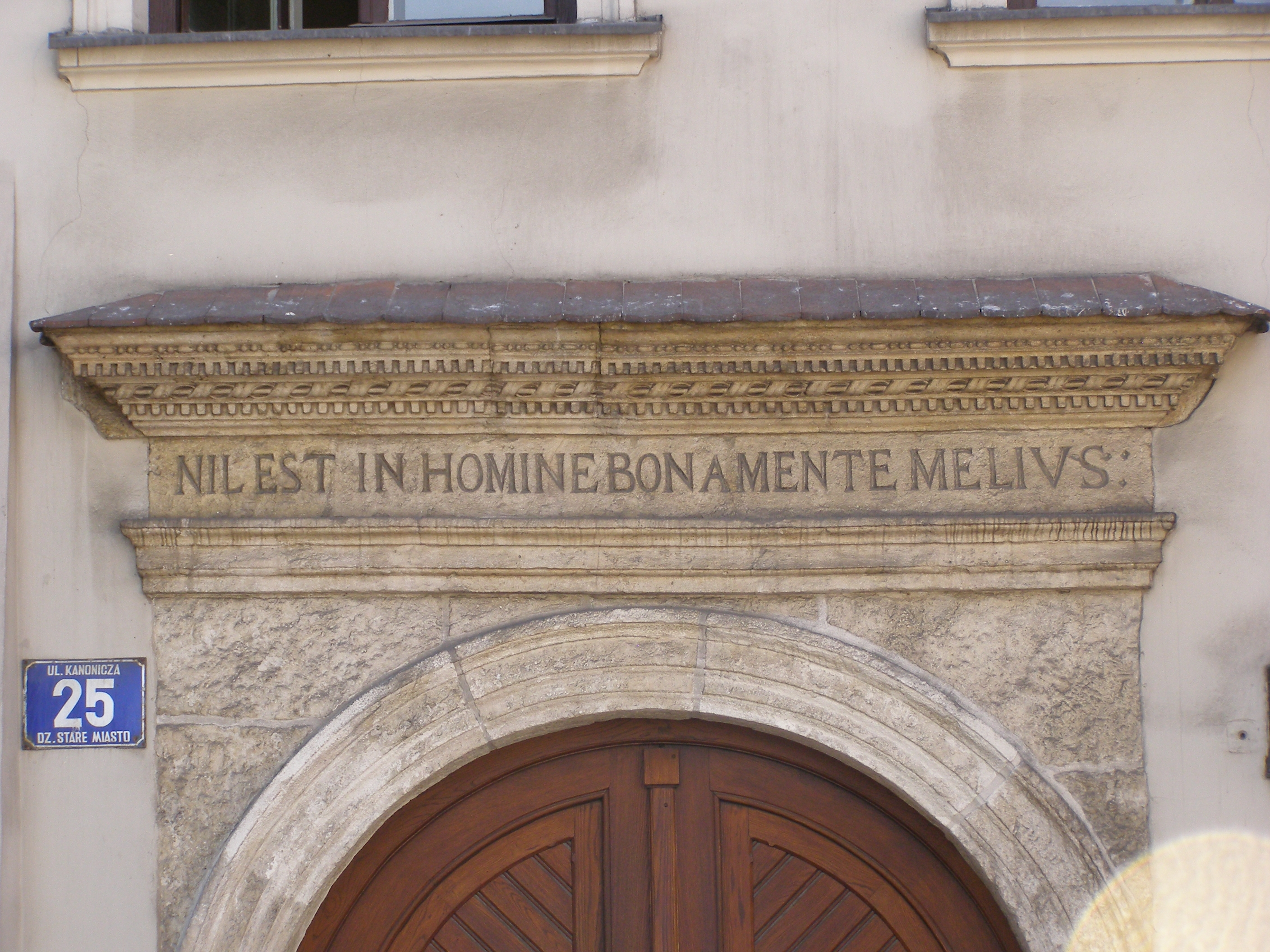
Inscription on the portal

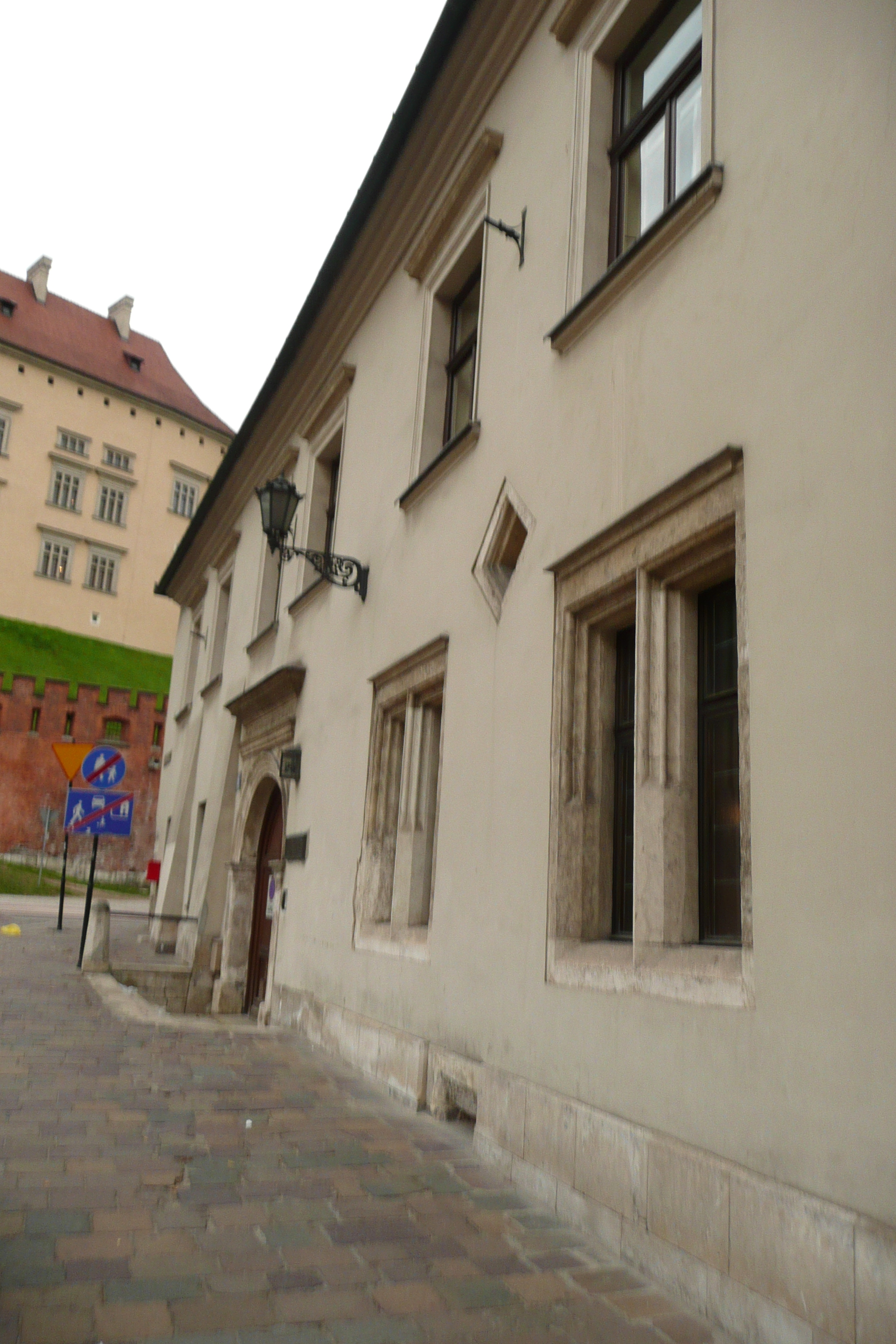
Facade from Kanonicza Street with Gothic windows of the first floor and a window above them

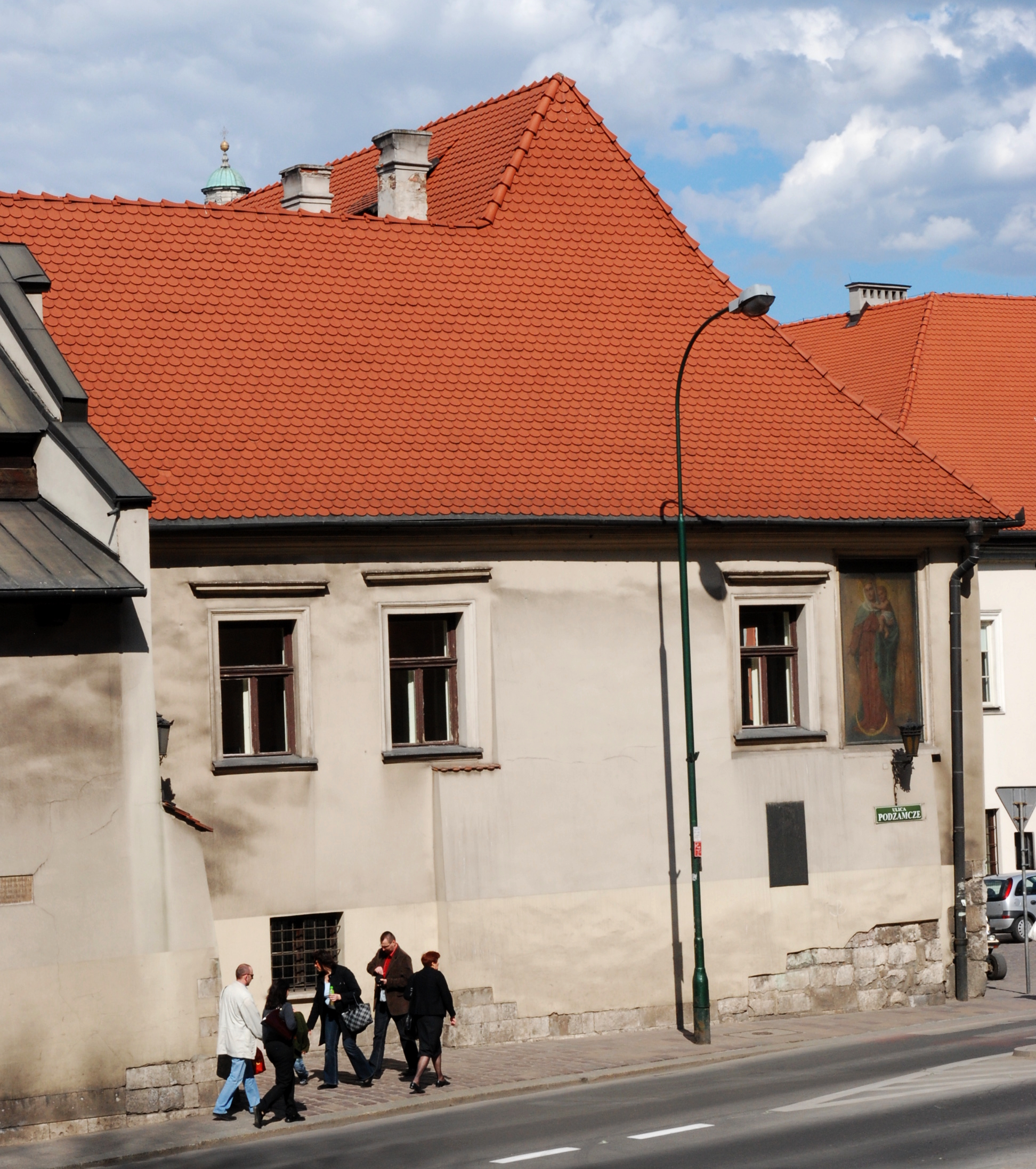
South elevation of the east wing of the house with a picture of the Virgin Mary and a plaque dedicated to Stanisław Wyspiański

=== General description ===
Długosz House is located at 25 Kanonicza Street, on the corner with Podzamcze Street. It is a building that has been reconstructed several times, with its interiors extensively transformed, resulting in the significant loss of its original character, and the street level around it has been raised. However, compared to the other buildings on Kanonicza Street, it has partially retained its medieval form.

Constructed from rough stone and brick, the walls were scarped in 1571. It is entirely one-story, forming a horseshoe shape with a courtyard in the middle, closed to the north by the wall of the adjacent building. The southern wing, the result of Długosz's expansion, (Note: The lack of many features in common between this part of the building and other objects founded by Długosz is explained by the fact that it was an addition and not a new building (Buczek & Gawęda (1980, p. 120)).) protrudes further forward towards Wawel than the southern facade of the eastern wing, the older part of the building. The house is covered by a gable roof over the eastern wing and a Polish roof over the Długosz part, introduced in 1775, adorned with vegetal polychrome running along the molding dividing the roofing halfway up its height.

The oldest parts of the walls (the former bathhouse) have survived on the ground floor and in the basement, in the corner of the eastern wing. Additionally, Gothic elements are incorporated in various parts of the house, and on the facade facing Kanonicza Street, two large Gothic windows have been preserved, along with a small window from the 15th century above them. Renaissance elements of the building include friezes above the windows and a portal from the second half of the 16th century, decorated with an inscription with the motto Nil est in homine bona mente melius (There is nothing better in a man than a good mind). (Note: This sentence was quoted by John Paul II in his speech on the occasion of the 600th anniversary of the Theological Faculty of the Jagiellonian University, which he delivered on 8 June 1997 (Jan Paweł II (1997)).) Inside, architectural stone details from this period and parts of the ceiling frieze have been discovered. Moreover, later galleries from the courtyard side and a carved Jastrzębiec coat of arms on the barrel vault in the vestibule have been preserved.

=== Facade painting ===
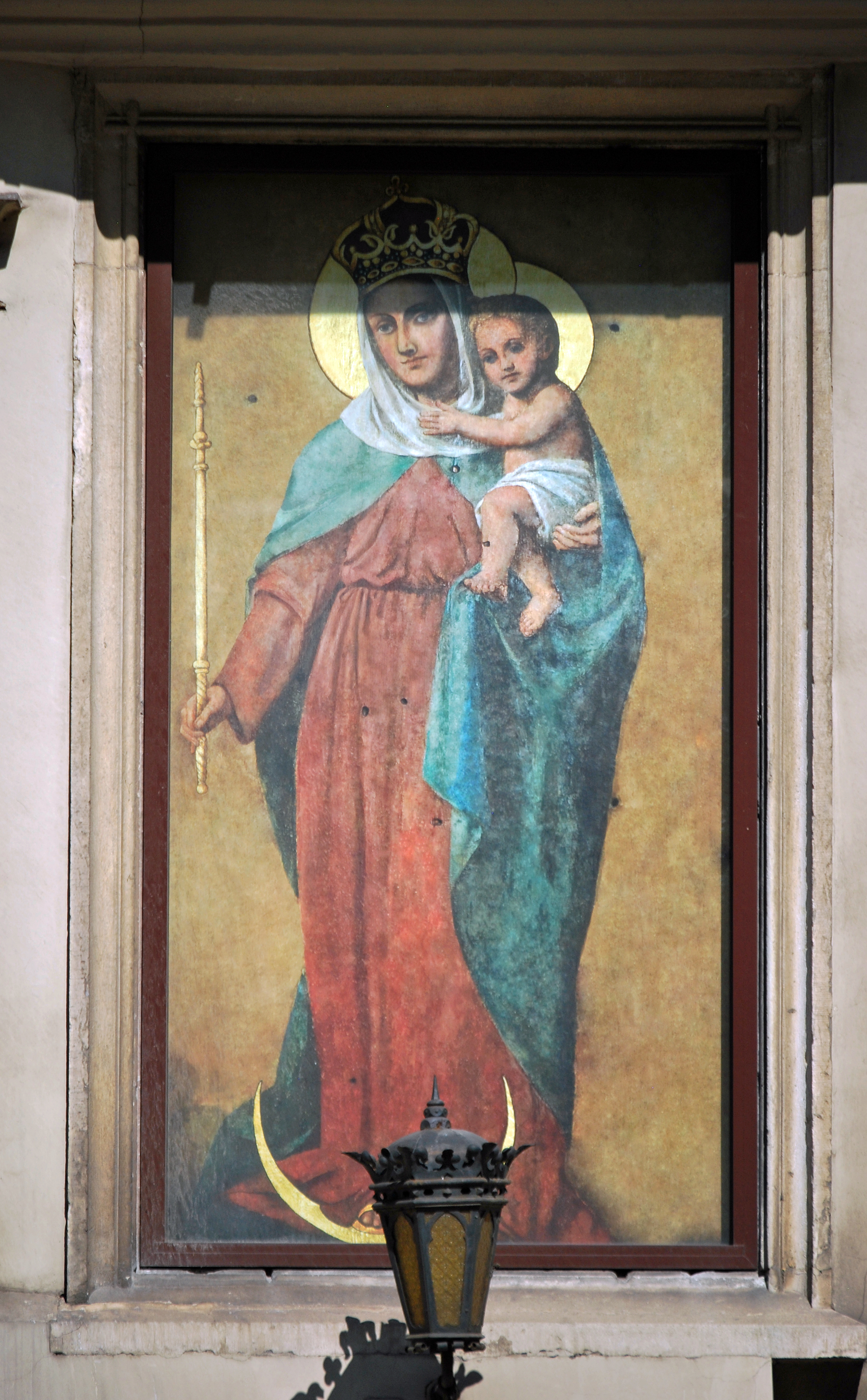
Our Lady with the Child. In the image are bullets, according to tradition, from Swedish muskets.

On the southern facade of the eastern wing, there is a Baroque painting of the Mother of God with the Child, painted on wood and of natural size. It dates back to the 17th or 18th century. The painting was restored by the painter Lisowski in 1828, then by Wojciech Eljasz-Radzikowski in 1863 (at the expense of Ignacy Kruszewski, who was imprisoned in Wawel at that time), and finally by Jan Głuszkiewicz in 1890. The painting bears traces of sixteen bullet holes of unknown origin. These are associated with the times of the Swedish Deluge, the Bar Confederation, or the street fights on 26 April 1848, during the Springtime of the Peoples.

=== Plaques on facades ===
The oldest of the plaques originates from the Psalterium in Wawel, the house of the college of clergy (sixteen psalterists and a cleric) founded by Jadwiga and Jagiełło in 1393. Jan Długosz renovated this building (or erected a new one in the place of the destroyed one) in 1480. A plaque was placed above the entrance, and only it has survived from the building, which was demolished in 1856 by the Austrians, who were adapting the hill into a citadel. At the expense of the chapter, the relocated plaque was transferred to one of the buildings on Kanonicza Street, and in 1880, during the First Congress of Polish Historians, it was embedded in the facade of the southern wing of the Długosz House, facing Wawel, in place of one of the windows on the upper floor.

The lower part of it is occupied by an inscription, made in raised, late Gothic letters, describing the foundation:

Pro Collegio Psalteristar(um) (Note: In parentheses is an expansion of the abbreviations used on the plaque.) ecc(lesia)e craeovien (Note: Word misspelled as a result of a stonemason's mistake when making the plaque or during conservation. Correctly should read Cracovien (Konszkow (2003, p. 46)).) (sis) per Wladislau(m) secundu(m) rege(m) et Heduigim reginam(m) Polonie fundato Johannes Longini Cano(n)icus Cracovien(sis) ad honore(m) Dei omnipote(n)tis fabricavit me anno mille(simo)°cccc°octuagesimo (Translation: For the Psalterists' College of the Kraków church founded by Władysław II, the king, and Jadwiga, the queen of Poland, Jan Długosz, a canon of Kraków, built me in honor of the Almighty God in the year 1480.)

The upper part is a bas-relief depicting the Madonna seated on a throne with the Child on her lap, in front of whom kneels the founder, with folded hands in prayer and eyes directed towards the Virgin Mary. Behind him stands St. John the Baptist, the patron recommending him, holding a book and a lamb in his left hand, and placing his right hand on the kneeling figure's shoulder. The identification of the founder is indicated by the shield with the Wieniawa coat of arms placed at his feet, as well as the attire of the canon – a rochet or alb with wide sleeves, an almuce, and a biretta on his head.

Such a representation and the form of the inscription were typical for foundation plaques. What distinguishes them from many other monuments of this kind is the absence of a model of the Psalteria in the hands of the canon. Perhaps this was an expression of the founder's humility or the fact that the building was not erected by him, but only rebuilt. None of the plaques on other buildings erected by Długosz use such a representation pattern.

Despite some damage, the depiction of the chronicler on the plaque from the Psalteria house drew considerable attention, being the only one made during his lifetime. It was even considered a portrait of Długosz, but later research cast doubt on this judgment. It seems that in this case, it is a stylized image, which conveys the character of the model through external means (clothing, coat of arms), with a conventional expression of his seriousness and dignity. Perhaps the artist, the creator of the plaque, introduced certain realistic elements in the features of the founder's character, especially on the face – full, with a strongly outlined chin, large eyes, and prominent nose, from which two deep grooves run. The assessment of the credibility of this likeness is hindered by the fact that there are no other images of Długosz made during his lifetime. Surely, the sculptor used some real, characteristic features of the founder's physiognomy, although their faithful reproduction was not important to him. The likeness on the plaque is therefore a work on the border between conventionality and portraiture.

Below the plaque from the Wawel Psalteria, a tablet was placed, which briefly presented this memento of the chronicler in Latin:

Diruta Domo Collegii Psalteristarum in monte Wawel MDCCLVI olim a Joanne Dlugosz Can(onico) Ecclesiae Cath.(edralis) Cracov.(iensis) fundata lapis hic unicus ex illa superstes quattuor saeculis post huc translatus est anno Domini MDCCCLXXX. (Note: Nineteenth-century studies present this inscription in a different form. Polkowski (1880, p. 11) and Bąkowski (1897, pp. 10–11) do not provide the ending date, as does Hoszowski (1882, pp. 48–49), where before the phrase huc translatus est, there is also the sentence opera Capitule Cath. ne injuriam aëris hominunque patertur.) (Translation: After the demolition in 1856 of the House of the Psalterists' College, once founded on Wawel Hill by Jan Długosz, a canon of the Krakow Cathedral, this stone, the only one remaining from it, was transferred here 400 years later in the year of Our Lord 1880.)

On the same facade, slightly below the line of the second-floor windows and at a certain distance from the relic of the Psalteria, another plaque was unveiled on 12 July 1880, this time in Polish, commemorating the place of Długosz's life and work:

Ta część domu dobudowana przez braci Długoszów roku 1450, tu Jan Długosz mieszkał lat 30, tu pisał dzieje Polski i tu umarł 1480 r. (Note: Polkowski (1880, p. 11) presents it differently: Tę część domu roku 1450 dobudował Jan Długosz, w domu tym mieszkał lat 30, tu pisał dzieje Polski i tu dokonał żywota swego. (This part of the house was added by Jan Długosz in the year 1450, he lived in this house for 30 years, here he wrote the history of Poland and here he passed away.)) (Translation: This part of the house, built by the Długosz brothers in 1450, is where Jan Długosz lived for 30 years, where he wrote the history of Poland, and where he died in 1480.)

Another commemorative plaque, placed on the house of Długosz from the side of Podzamcze Street, was dedicated to Stanisław Wyspiański. (Note: The incorrect information that the plaque is dedicated to his father, Franciszek Wyspiański, is provided by Stachowski (2000, pp. 156, 1072). However, in another part of the same work, it is stated that it commemorates Stanisław (Stachowski (2000, p. 978)).) Made of bronze and designed by Bronisław Chromy, it was installed in 1967, on the sixtieth anniversary of the death of the Young Poland artist, in the southern facade of the eastern wing. It was funded by students of the Wyspiański Technical School of Clothing. The plaque features his bust, below which is a stanza from the poem At the foot of Wawel, father had a workshop...

On 28 November 2015, during the ceremony closing the Year of Jan Długosz, a new commemorative plaque dedicated to the chronicler was unveiled on the building (from the side of Kanonicza Street). It was designed by Andrzej Zwolak, a professor at the Jan Matejko Academy of Fine Arts, and funded by the Papal University. It bears a quote from the Chronicles – "Love of the Homeland usually surpasses all other loves" – in Latin.

Plaques from the facade of Długosz House

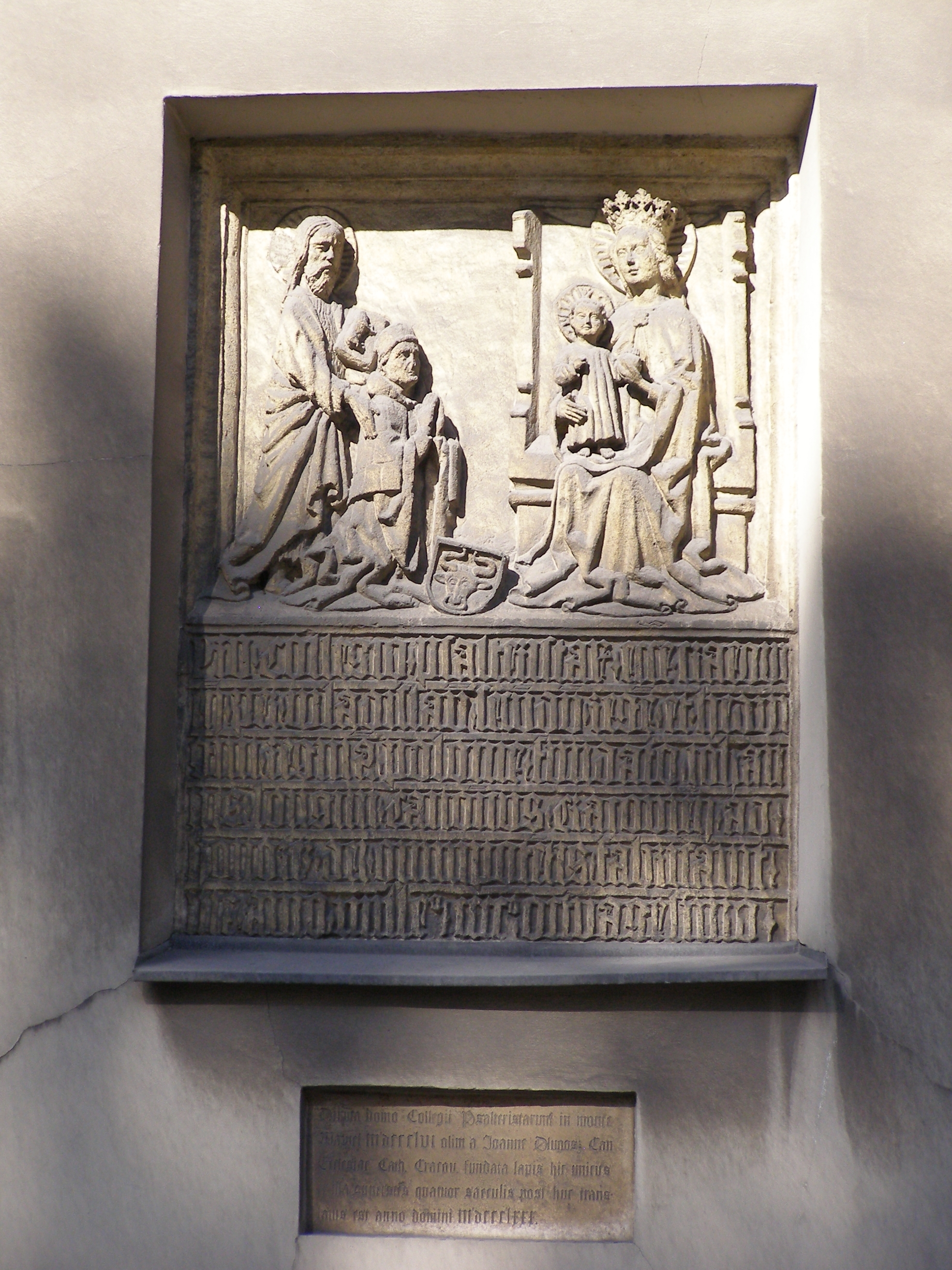
Foundation plaque of the Psalteria, below is a 19th century plaque with its Latin description

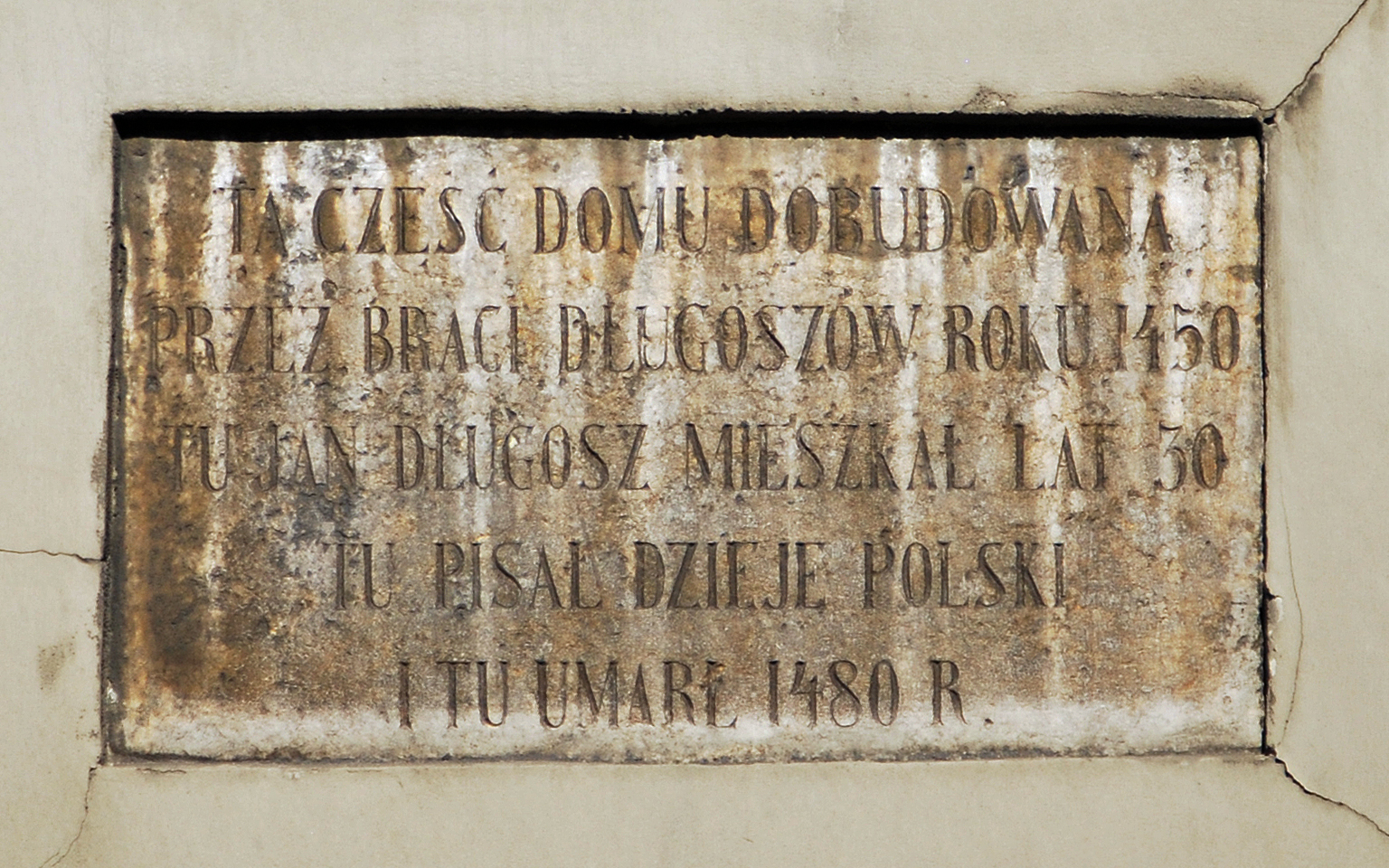
Commemorative plaque from 1880

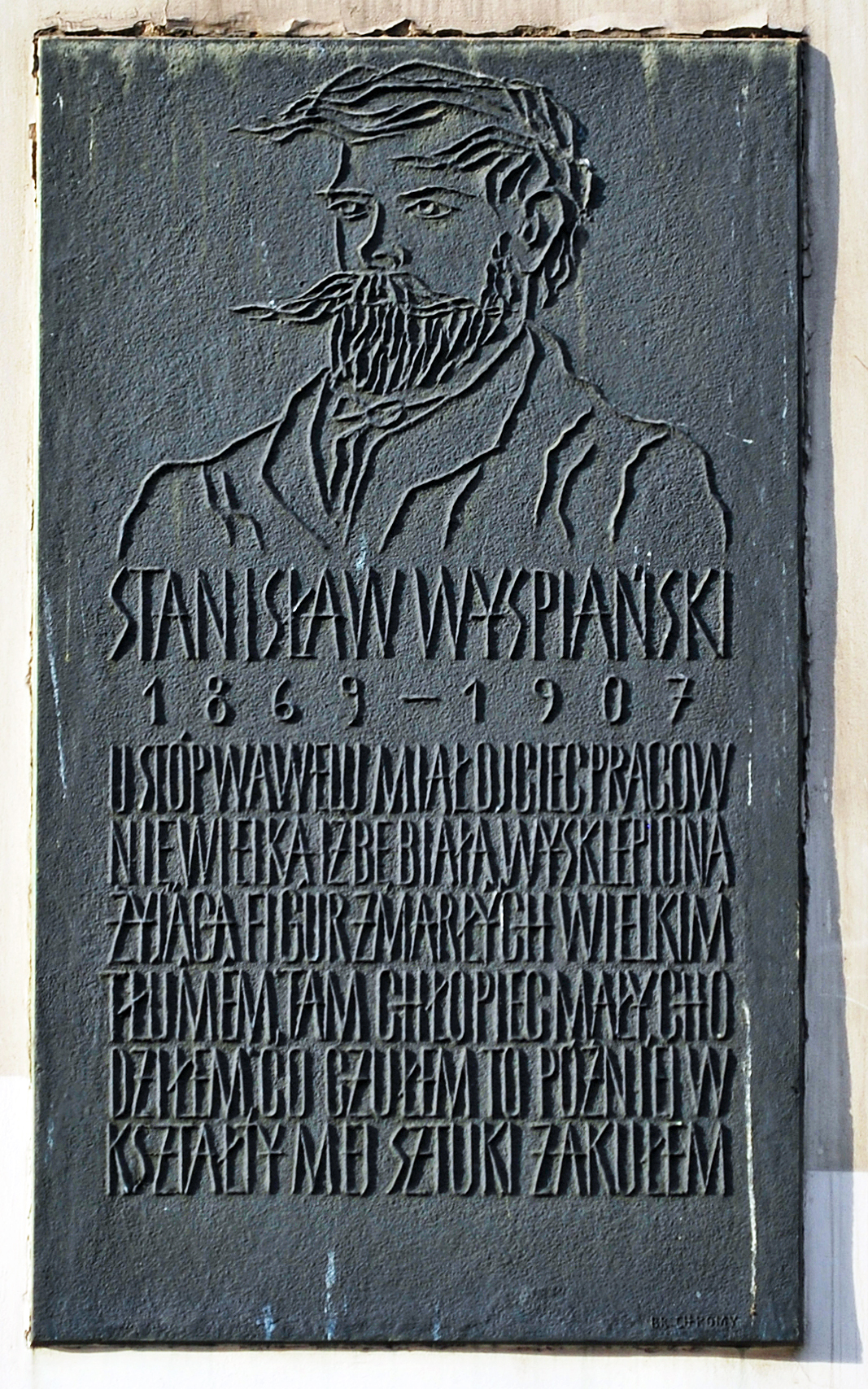
Plaque dedicated to Stanisław Wyspiański

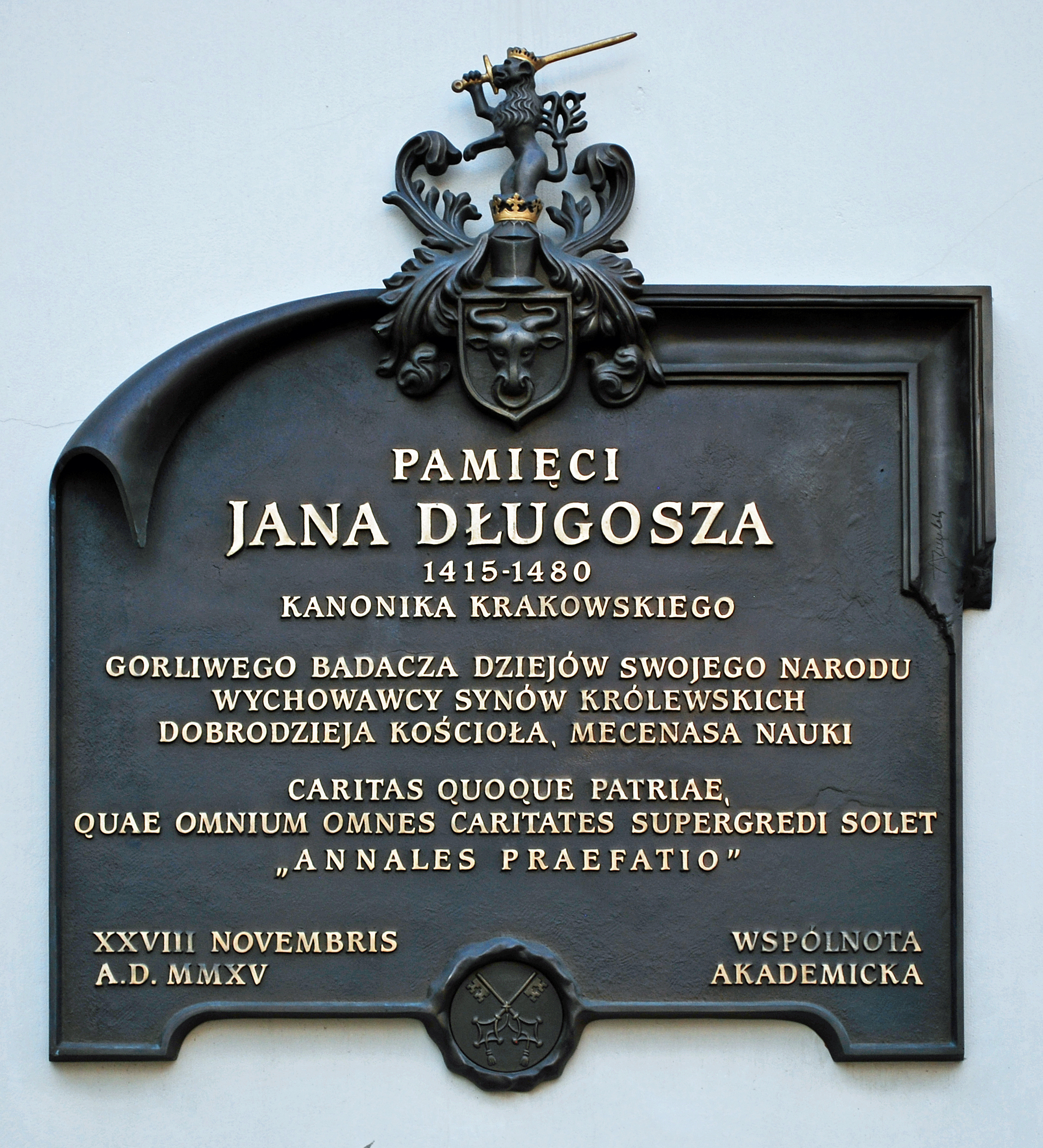
Commemorative plaque dedicated to Jan Długosz, unveiled in 2015

== Clergy residents of the house ==
The following list is provided based on the work of K. Hoszowski, supplemented with information from other sources. Due to gaps in archival material, it is not complete. For some canons, only the date of moving in or out of the house is known, sometimes only the year under which they were recorded as occupying this property. The symbol † next to the end date indicates that the clergyman died while residing in the house; in other cases, leaving the house was related to moving to another building or resigning from a position in the chapter after assuming another ecclesiastical dignity.

=== Canons living in the house from the first half of the 15th century to 1839 ===
Mikołaj Hinczowic (Note: Hinczowic, according to Stachowski (2000, p. 156) and Kowalski (2000, p. 223)) of Kazimierz, 1415 (or 1430)	Jan Konarski, from 1503 (Note: It is known that he lived in this house as early as 1500, together with Baruchowski.)	Jakub Montano, from 1571 to 1580 †	Łukasz Dębski, from 1631 to 1634	Jan Kazimierz de Alten Bokum, from 1690 to 1701
Jan of Rudzica, (Note: "of Rudnica", according to Rożek (2000, p. 320)) 1415 (or 1430)	Jan Karnkowski, from 1503 to 1504	Zbigniew Ziółkowski, from 1580 to 1583 †	Wojciech Purzycki, (Note: Purzecki, according to Polkowski (1880, p. 13)) from 1634 to 639 †	Michał Trzebiński, from 1701 to 1734
Jan of Radochonice, (Note: Spelling adopted from Stachowski (2000, p. 334). Spelled variously in the literature: Jan Wapowski, Jan Radochonicz, Jan (Wapowski) Radochonicze, Jan Wapowski of Radochnice, Jan Radochończa.) from 1439 to 1450 †	Piotr Tomicki, from 1504	Piotr Przerębski, from 1583 to 1585 †	Wacław Leszczyński, from 1639 to 1645	Jan Benedykt Grodzicki, from 1734 to 1751
Jan Długosz, from 1450 to 1480 †	Maciej Miechowita, from 1514 to 1516	Maciej Kłodziński, from 1585 to 1616 †	Justus Słowikowski, from 1645 to 1650	Walenty Pruski, from 1751 to 1776
Jan Długosz the younger, from 1453 to 1471 †	Maciej Drzewicki, from 1514 (1515) (Note: The year in which Drzewicki moved into this house poses certain problems. Polkowski and Hoszowski give the date as 1514, adding that after his appointment to the Bishop of Kuyavia, the house was designated for John of the Lithuanian Dukes. However, it is known from other sources that Drzewicki's nomination took place in 1513. On the other hand, Bąkowski mentions the year 1515 in relation to Drzewicki.)	Mikołaj Lubomirski, from 1616 to 1617 †	Wawrzyniec Gembicki, from 1650 to 1653†	Adam Łętowski, from 1776 to 1778 †
Jakub of Szadek, from 1472 to 1487 †	John of the Lithuanian Dukes, in 1514 (Note: Date given by Bąkowski (1897, p. 11))	Andrzej Szyszkowski, from 1617 to 1622	Mikołaj Leżeński, until 1674	Ignacy Bieńkowski, from 1778 to 1782
Grzegorz Lubrański, from 1480	Bernard Wapowski, from 1516	Erazm Kretowski, from 1622 to 1625	Zbigniew Jan Lanckoroński, from 1674 to 1678 †	Ignacy Wojczyński, from 1782 to 1789
Jan Leszczyński, from 1487	Walenty Herburt, from 1560	Albert Łubieński, from 1625	Andrzej Pągowski, from 1678 to 1683	Augustyn Karol Lipiński, from 1789 to 1814 †
Jan Baruchowski, in 1500	Franciszek Krasiński, from 1560 to 1571	Marcin Karnkowski, until 1631 †	Andrzej Tobiasz Żaboklicki, from 1683 to 1690 †	Hipolit Starowiejski, from 1814 to 1825 †

=== Vice-prosecutors and notaries of the chapter residing in the house since 1839 ===
Ludwik Haselquist (vice-prosecutor until 1842), Sylwester Grzybowski (vice-prosecutor until 1850), Józef Godlewski (vice-prosecutor until 1861, from 1850 to 1852 notary), Jan Pietrzykowski (notary until 1861, vice-prosecutor until 1872), Teofil Miodowicz, Józef Krzemiński (notary from 1861 to 1867), Juliusz Bukowski (notary until 1876), Ignacy Polkowski (notary from 1877).

== See also ==
- Długosz House in Sandomierz
- Długosz House in Wiślica

== Bibliography ==
- Adamczewski, Jan (2003). Mała encyklopedia Krakowa. Kraków: Hurnex. ISBN 8391880206.
- Bąkowski, Klemens (1897). Dom Jana Długosza. Biblioteka Krakowska, No. 2. Kraków: Towarzystwo Miłośników Historyi i Zabytków Krakowa.
- Banach, Stefan; Demel, Juliusz (1953). "Katalog materiałów ikonograficznych, dotyczących otoczenia Wawelu". Przemiany dziejowe otoczenia Wawelu. Zarys dziejów, stan obecny, przegląd zabytków, materiały ikonograficzne. Warsaw-Kraków: Komitet Przebudowy Otoczenia Wawelu.
- Bicz-Suknarowska, Maria; Niewalda, Waldemar; Rojkowska, Halina (1997). "Zabudowa rezydencjonalna (kanonicza) dawnego Okołu w XVI wieku". Między gotykiem a barokiem. Sztuka Krakowa XVI i XVII wieku. Materiały sesji naukowej zorganizowanej przez Oddział Krakowski Stowarzyszenia Historyków Sztuki 20 marca 1993 r. Biblioteka Krakowska, No. 136. Kraków: Towarzystwo Miłośników Historii i Zabytków Krakowa. ISBN 83-90910-4-5-4.
- Bicz-Suknarowska, Maria; Niewalda, Waldemar; Rojkowska, Halina (1996). "Zabudowa ulicy Kanoniczej na tle urbanistyki średniowiecznego Okołu". Sztuka około 1400. Materiały Sesji Stowarzyszenia Historyków Sztuki, Poznań, listopad 1995. Vol. 1. Warsaw: Arx Regia Ośrodek Wydawniczy Zamku Królewskiego w Warszawie. ISBN 83-905667-2-9.
- Borowiejska-Birkenmajerowa, Maria (1975). Kształt średniowiecznego Krakowa. Cracoviana, seria I Zabytki. Kraków: Wydawnictwo Literackie.
- Buczek, Anna (1980). "Mecenat artystyczny Jana Długosza w dziedzinie architektury". In Gawęda, Stanisław (ed.). Dlugossiana. Studia historyczne w pięćsetlecie śmierci Jana Długosza. Zeszyty Naukowe Uniwersytetu Jagiellońskiego. Prace Historyczne, z. 65. Warsaw: Państwowe Wydawnictwo Naukowe. ISBN 83-01-01640-X.
- Długosz, Jan (2004). Wyrozumski, Jerzy (ed.). Jana Długosza Roczniki, czyli Kroniki sławnego Królestwa Polskiego. Vol. 12. Translated by Mrukówna, Julia. Warsaw: Wydawnictwo Naukowe PWN. ISBN 83-01-14304-5.
- Dobrzycki, Jerzy (1953). "Zarys dziejów otoczenia Wawelu". Przemiany dziejowe otoczenia Wawelu. Zarys dziejów, stan obecny, przegląd zabytków, materiały ikonograficzne. Warsaw-Kraków: Komitet Przebudowy Otoczenia Wawelu.
- Stachowski, Antoni Henryk, ed. (2000). Encyklopedia Krakowa. Warsaw-Kraków: Wydawnictwo Naukowe PWN. ISBN 83-01-13325-2.
- Fabiański, Marcin (2010). Złoty Kraków. Kraków: Wydawnictwo Literackie. ISBN 978-83-08-04442-1.
- Fabiański, Marcin; Purchla, Jacek (2001). Historia architektury Krakowa w zarysie. Kraków: Wydawnictwo Literackie. ISBN 83-08-03166-8.
- Gancarz, Bogdan (2015-11-28). "Unieśmiertelnił dzieje ojczyste". Gość Niedzielny (in Polish).
- Grzybowski, Stanisław (2003). Jan Długosz. Wielcy ludzie Kościoła. Kraków: Wydawnictwo WAM. ISBN 83-7318-133-4.
- Hoszowski, Konstanty (1882). Domy w Krakowie niegdyś braci, Janów Długoszów, Kanoników katedralnych Krakowskich. Kraków: Drukarnia Uniwersytetu Jagiellońskiego.
- Jan Paweł II (1997). "Przemówienie z okazji 600-lecia Wydziału Teologicznego Uniwersytetu Jagiellońskiego". JP2online (in Polish).
- Kęder, Iwona; Komorowski, Waldemar (2007). Ikonografia placu Wszystkich Świętych oraz ulic Franciszkańskiej, Poselskiej, Senackiej i Kanoniczej w Krakowie. Katalog Widoków Krakowa. Vol. 4. Kraków: Towarzystwo Autorów i Wydawców Prac Naukowych "Universitas", Muzeum Narodowe w Krakowie. ISBN 978-83-242-0755-8.
- Konszkow, Iwona S. (2002). "Dumna tablica skromnego kanonika". Mówią Wieki. Magazyn historyczny. 511 (7/02). Dom Wydawniczy Bellona. ISSN 1230-4018.
- Konszkow, Iwona S. (2003). "W sprawie tablicy Długosza". Mówią Wieki. Magazyn historyczny. 518 (2/03). Dom Wydawniczy Bellona. ISSN 1230-4018.
- Kowalski, Marek Daniel (2000). Uposażenie krakowskiej kapituły katedralnej w średniowieczu. Kraków: Towarzystwo Naukowe Societas Vistulana. ISBN 83-909094-3-X.
- Krasnowolski, Bogusław (1999). Prace konserwatorskie w Krakowie. Działalność Społecznego Komitetu Odnowy Zabytków Krakowa w latach 1990–1998. Warsaw: Galposter. ISBN 83-910968-0-7.
- Lepiarczyk, Józef; Łozińska, Halina; Świszczowski, Stefan (1953). "Przegląd zabytków w otoczeniu Wawelu". Przemiany dziejowe otoczenia Wawelu. Zarys dziejów, stan obecny, przegląd zabytków, materiały ikonograficzne. Warsaw-Kraków: Komitet Przebudowy Otoczenia Wawelu.
- Gierowski, Józef; Modelska-Strzelecka, Bożena (1973). "Bernard Wapowski". Krakowski krąg Mikołaja Kopernika. Zeszyty Naukowe Uniwersytetu Jagiellońskiego. Prace Historyczne, z. 42. Warsaw: Państwowe Wydawnictwo Naukowe.
- Mrukówna, Julia (1972). Jan Długosz. Życie i twórczość. Nauka dla wszystkich, No. 162. Kraków: Państwowe Wydawnictwo Naukowe.
- Ostrowski, Jan K. (1992). Kraków. Vol. 2. Warsaw: Wydawnictwa Artystyczne i Filmowe. ISBN 83-221-0618-1.
- Perzanowska, Agnieszka (1980). "Wiadomości źródłowe o życiu i działalności Jana Długosza". In Gawęda, Stanisław (ed.). Dlugossiana. Studia historyczne w pięćsetlecie śmierci Jana Długosza. Zeszyty Naukowe Uniwersytetu Jagiellońskiego. Prace Historyczne, z. 65. Warsaw: Państwowe Wydawnictwo Naukowe. ISBN 83-01-01640-X.
- Pieradzka, Krystyna (1975). Związki Długosza z Krakowem. Biblioteka Krakowska, No. 115. Kraków: Towarzystwo Miłośników Historii i Zabytków Krakowa, Wydawnictwo Literackie.
- Podgórnik, Iwona (1980). "Wizerunki Jana Długosza". In Gawęda, Stanisław (ed.). Dlugossiana. Studia historyczne w pięćsetlecie śmierci Jana Długosza. Zeszyty Naukowe Uniwersytetu Jagiellońskiego. Prace Historyczne, z. 76. Warsaw: Państwowe Wydawnictwo Naukowe. ISBN 83-01-05947-8.
- Polak, Wojciech (1999). Aprobata i spór. Zakon krzyżacki jako instytucja kościelna w dziełach Jana Długosza. Źródła i Monografie, 195. Lublin: Towarzystwo Naukowe Katolickiego Uniwersytetu Lubelskiego. ISBN 83-87703-75-3.
- Polkowski, Ignacy (1880). Dom Jana Długosza. Kartka z przeszłości. Kraków: Drukarnia "Czasu".
- Rożek, Michał (2000). Przewodnik po zabytkach i kulturze Krakowa. Vol. 2. Warsaw-Kraków: Wydawnictwo Naukowe PWN. ISBN 83-01-10989-0.
- Rożek, Michał (2012). Sekrety Krakowa. Ludzie-zdarzenia-idee. Kraków: Wydawnictwo WAM. ISBN 978-83-7318-233-2.
- Świątek, Henryk (1977). "Krakowskie mieszkania i pracownie Stanisława Wyspiańskiego". Krzysztofory. Zeszyty Naukowe Muzeum Historycznego Miasta Krakowa. 4.
- Tomczyk-Maryon, Marta (2009). Wyspiański. Biografia Sławnych Ludzi. Warsaw: Państwowy Instytut Wydawniczy. ISBN 978-83-06-03191-1.
- Tomkowicz, Stanisław (1985). Ulice i place Krakowa w ciągu wieków, ich nazwy i zmiany postaci. Kraków: Krajowa Agencja Wydawnicza.
- Ułaszyn, Henryk (1901). "Dr. Władysław Wisłocki. Notka biograficzno-bibliograficzna". Przegląd Bibliograficzny. 6. Kraków.
- Wyrozumski, Jerzy (1992). Kraków do schyłku wieków średnich. Dzieje Krakowa. Vol. 1. Kraków: Wydawnictwo Literackie. ISBN 83-08-02057-7.
- Dyba, Olga; Brzoskwinia, Waldemar; Róziewicz, Magdalena (2007). Zabytki architektury i budownictwa w Polsce. Kraków. Warsaw: Krajowy Ośrodek Badań i Dokumentacji Zabytków. ISBN 978-83-922906-8-1.
- Zbijewska, Krystyna (1980). Orzeł w kurniku. Z życia Stanisława Wyspiańskiego. Warsaw: Państwowy Instytut Wydawniczy. ISBN 83-06-00-335-7.
- Zbijewska, Krystyna (1986). Krakowskim szlakiem Stanisława Wyspiańskiego. Szlakiem Wielkich Ludzi, Wydarzeń, Zabytków Kultury. Warsaw-Kraków: Wydawnictwo PTTK "Kraj". ISBN 83-7005-069-7.
- Ziejka, Franciszek (2007). "U stóp Wawelu miał ojciec pracownię.". Alma Mater. Miesięcznik Uniwersytetu Jagiellońskiego (97). Polish Scientific Publishers PWN. ISSN 1427-1176.
