= Archdiocesan Museum, Kraków =

Coordinates: 50°03′23″N 19°56′15″E

Archdiocesan Museum in Krakow
- Muzeum Archidiecezjalne Kardynała Karola Wojtyły w Krakowie
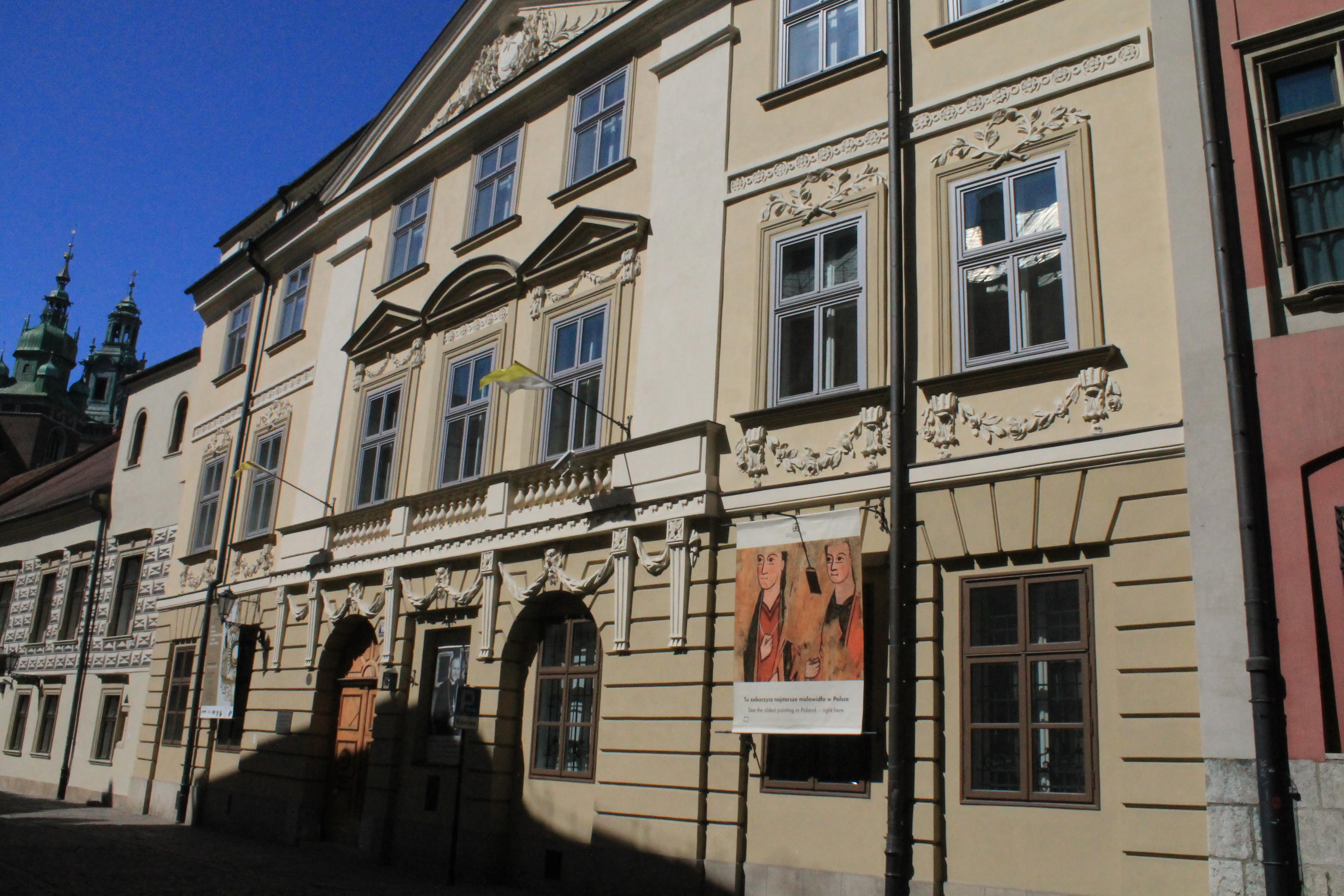

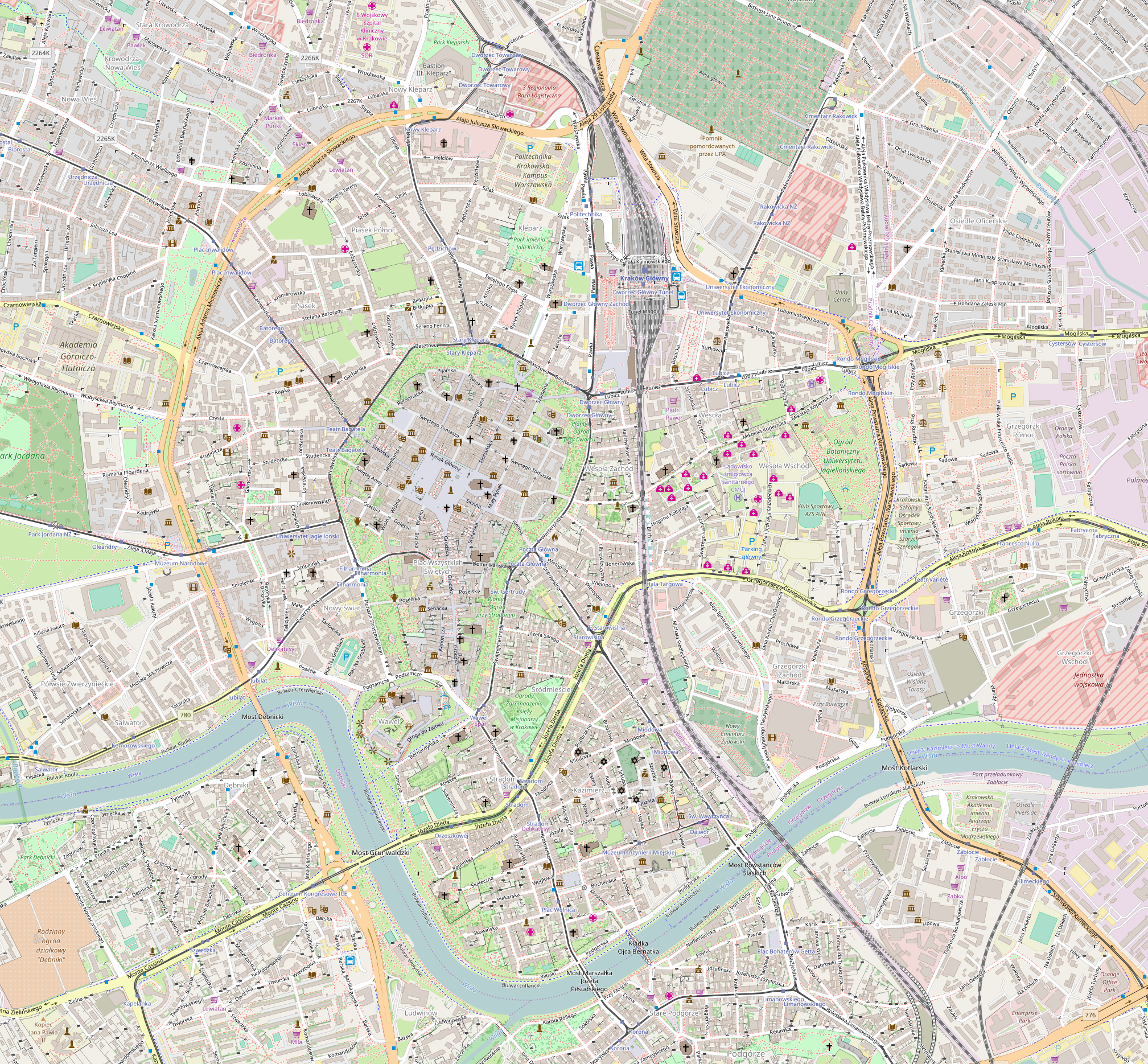
- Location within Central Kraków
- Established: 1906; 120 years ago
- Location: Kanonicza St. 19, 31-002 Kraków, Poland

The Archdiocesan Museum in Krakow (Polish: Muzeum Archidiecezjalne w Krakowie) is a museum consisting of Cardinal Karol Wojtyła's former residence in Krakow in houses no. 19–21 at Kanonicza Street. The museum was established in 1906 by Cardinal Jan Puzyna, but in its present form has existed since 1994. The official opening of the museum took place on 5 May 1994 and was performed by Cardinal Franciszek Macharski.

The Archdiocesan Museum in Krakow is the house where Karol Wojtyła (later Pope John Paul II) as a young priest, then bishop and finally cardinal lived for 17 years, between 1951 and 1967. Due to this fact, an important part of the museum's collection consists of personal objects, which belonged to Karol Wojtyła, exhibited in the former rooms that were inhabited by him.

Those objects are not only of sentimental, historical or artistic value but, above all, they allow us to take a closer look at the most important values present in life and ordained ministry of this great saint, as well as his rich teachings, which are still valid and important in the present days.

For cardinal Wojtyła, the idea of creating an Archdiocesan Museum in Krakow as a place which would present the spiritual, historical and artistic legacy of the Archdiocese of Krakow was a truly crucial matter. According to his wish, collection of sacral art from the 13th to 20th century, including paintings, sculpture and handcrafts from the region of the Archdiocese of Krakow, can be seen in the Museum. Among others it consist the oldest painted panel in Poland dated to the mid. 13th century and originated from wooden church in Dębno Podhalańskie.

Through many temporary exhibitions the Archdiocesan Museum also aims to promote the contemporary artists focusing on Christian art.

In the year 2020, the Archdiocesan Museum in Krakow, in cooperation with Institute of Intercultural Dialogue of John Paul II in Krakow, is preparing an exhibition entitled “The Shepherd” (“Pasterz”). The exposition is consist of Karol Wojtyła's personal belongings – especially from his bishopric, archbishopric and cardinal periods, gifts he had been obtained from faithful at that time and objects from the period of his pontificate as a Pope – John Paul II.
