= Florian Mokrski Palace =

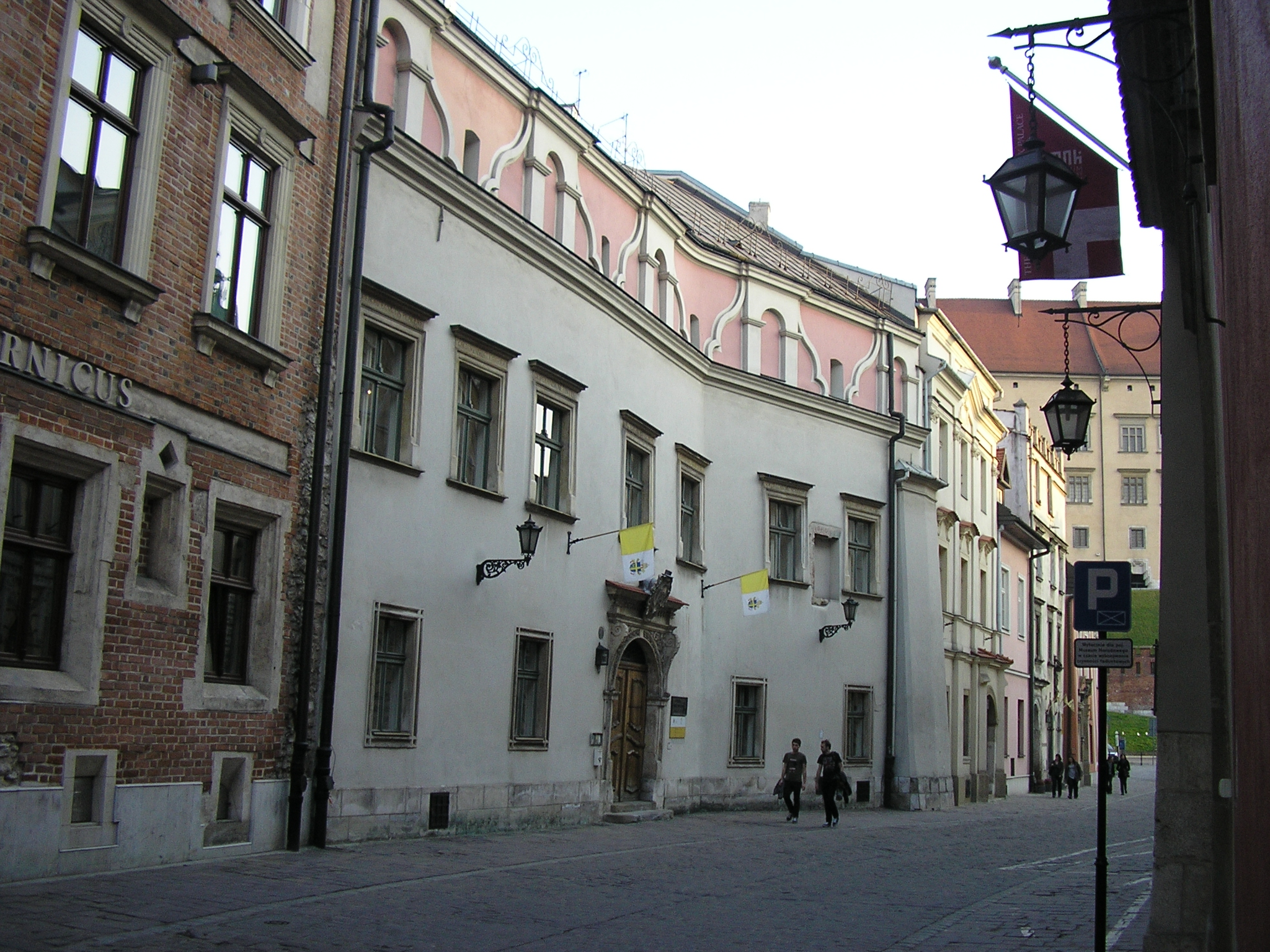
- Florian Mokrski Palace
- Interactive map of Florian Mokrski Palace
- 50°03′21″N 19°56′15″E
- Location: Kraków, Lesser Poland Voivodeship; in Poland

History
- Built: 14th century

Site notes
- Architectural style: Baroque

Florian Mokrski Palace (Polish: Pałac biskupa Floriana z Mokrska) - a historical building, located by 18 Kanonicza Street in the Old Town of Kraków, Poland.

The palace owes its name to Florian Mokrski, who from 1367 to 1380 was a Bishop of Kraków. Around 1540, the building became property of Jan Andrzej Valentino - the doctor of Queen Bona and Zygmunt I. After the fire in 1544 the house was renovated by its next owner, Stanisław Hozjusz. The palace was completely rebuilt in the years 1560-1563 thanks to the canon of Marcin Izdbieński, probably with the participation of Jan Michalowicz from Dziennikowa (to whom the palace's portal is dedicated). Later reconstructions of the palace took place in the first half of the eighteenth century and in the nineteenth century. The courtyard is decorated with sgraffiti décor.

The palace became the seat of Saint Pope John Paul II Centre "Do not be afraid" ("Nie lękajcie się").

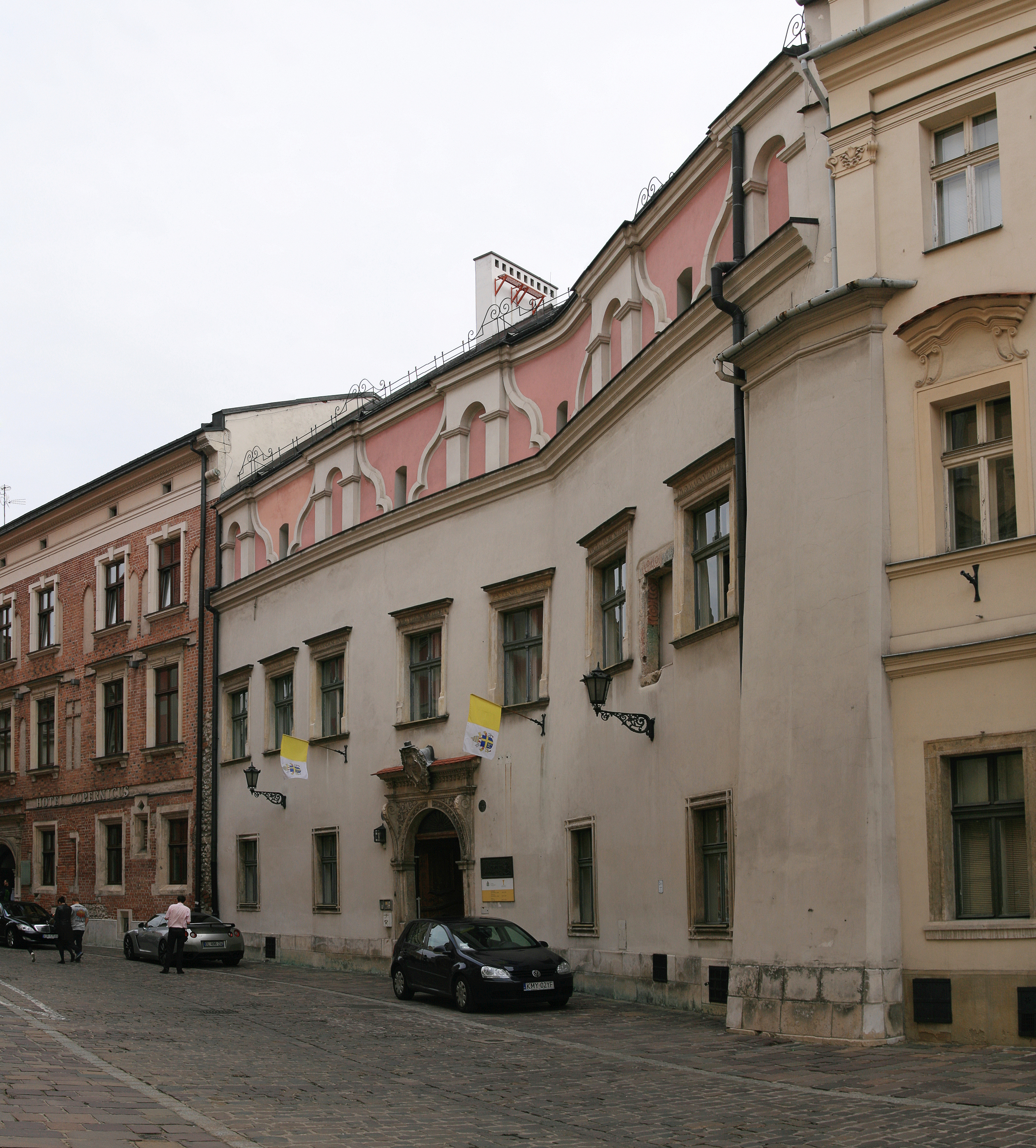
View of Kanoniczna Street

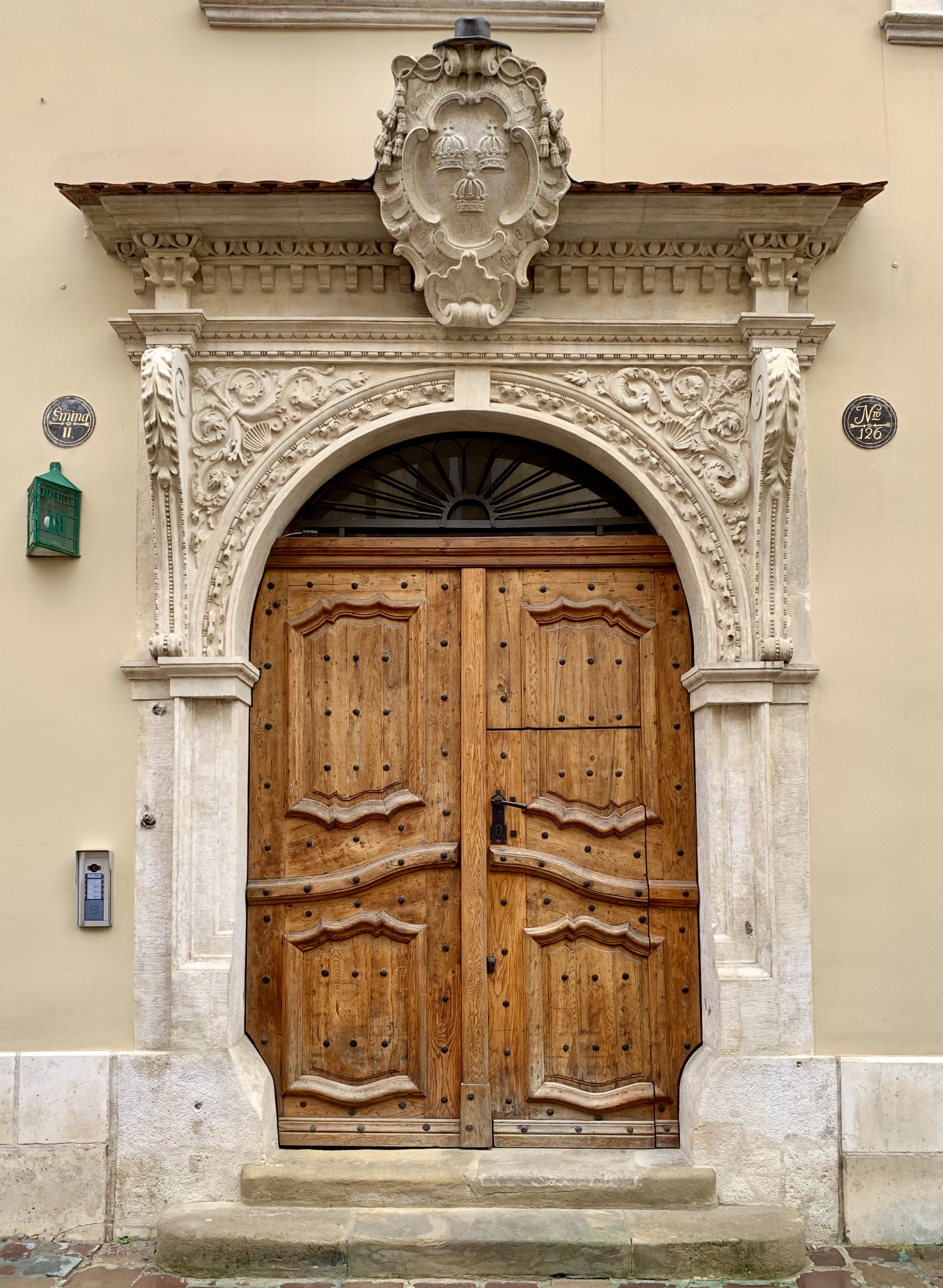
View of the portal
