= Kanonicza Street, Kraków =

Street in Kraków, Poland

Kanonicza Street
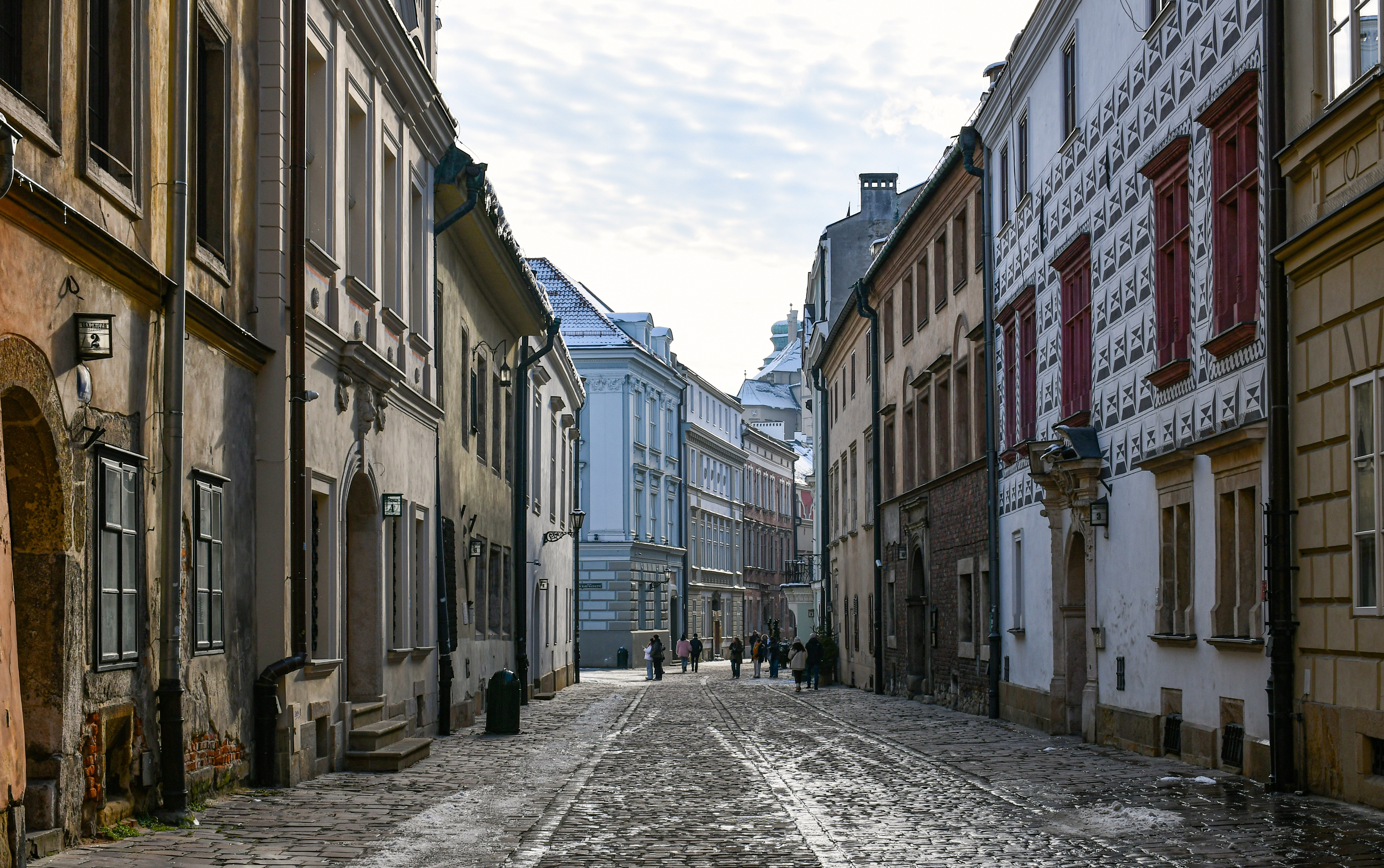
- View of Kanonicza Street from Senacka Street (from N)

- Native name: ulica Kanonicza (Polish)
- Length: 225 m (738 ft)
- Location: Kraków; Poland
- Coordinates: 50°03′24″N 19°56′15″E
- North end: Senacka Street
- South end: Podzamcze Street, Wawel Hill

UNESCO World Heritage Site
- Type: Cultural
- Criteria: iv
- Designated: 1978
- Part of: Historic Centre of Kraków
- Reference no.: 29
- Region: Europe and North America

Historic Monument of Poland
- Designated: 1994-09-08
- Part of: Kraków historical city complex
- Reference no.: M.P. 1994 nr 50 poz. 418

Kanonicza Street (Polish: Ulica Kanonicza, lit. Canon Street) - a historic street in Old Town of Kraków, Poland.

The street was once part of the hamlet of Okół, connected with Kraków in 1401. Formerly, the buildings along the street housed cathedral canons, and to this day many of their Baroque and Renaissance have remained present.

The southern end of the street was closed off with the Poboczna Gate, demolished during the urban modernisation of Kraków.

== Features ==
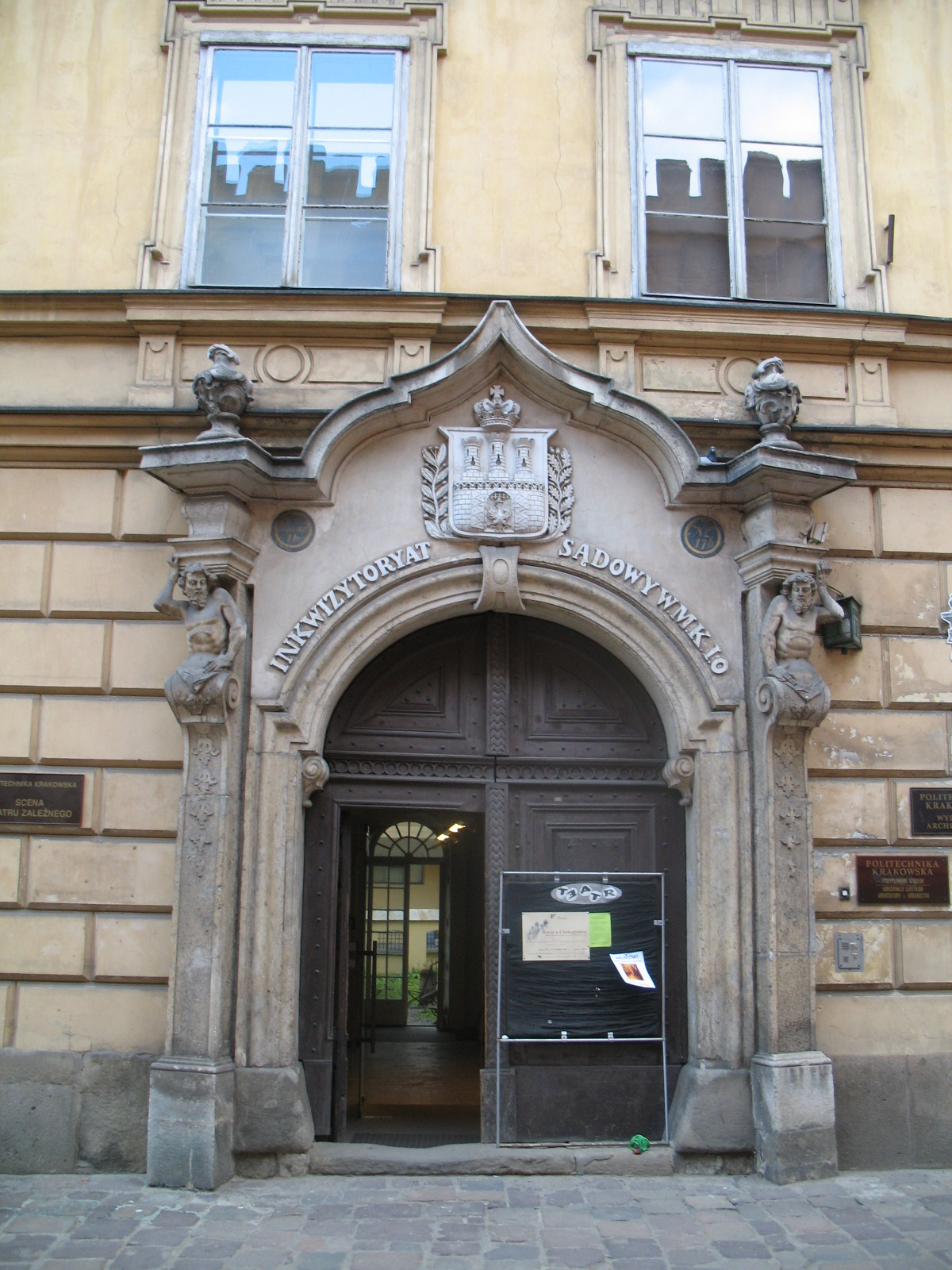
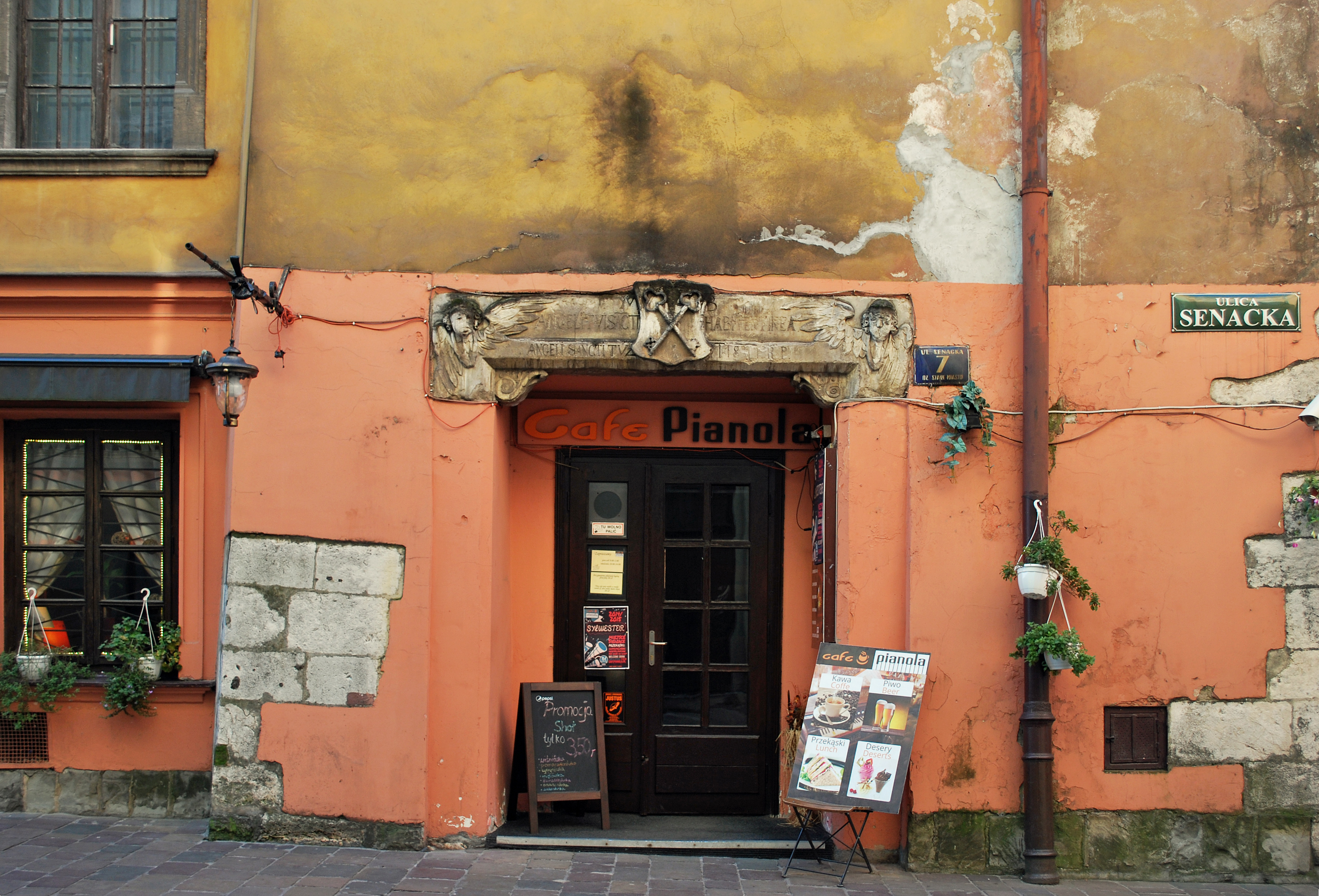
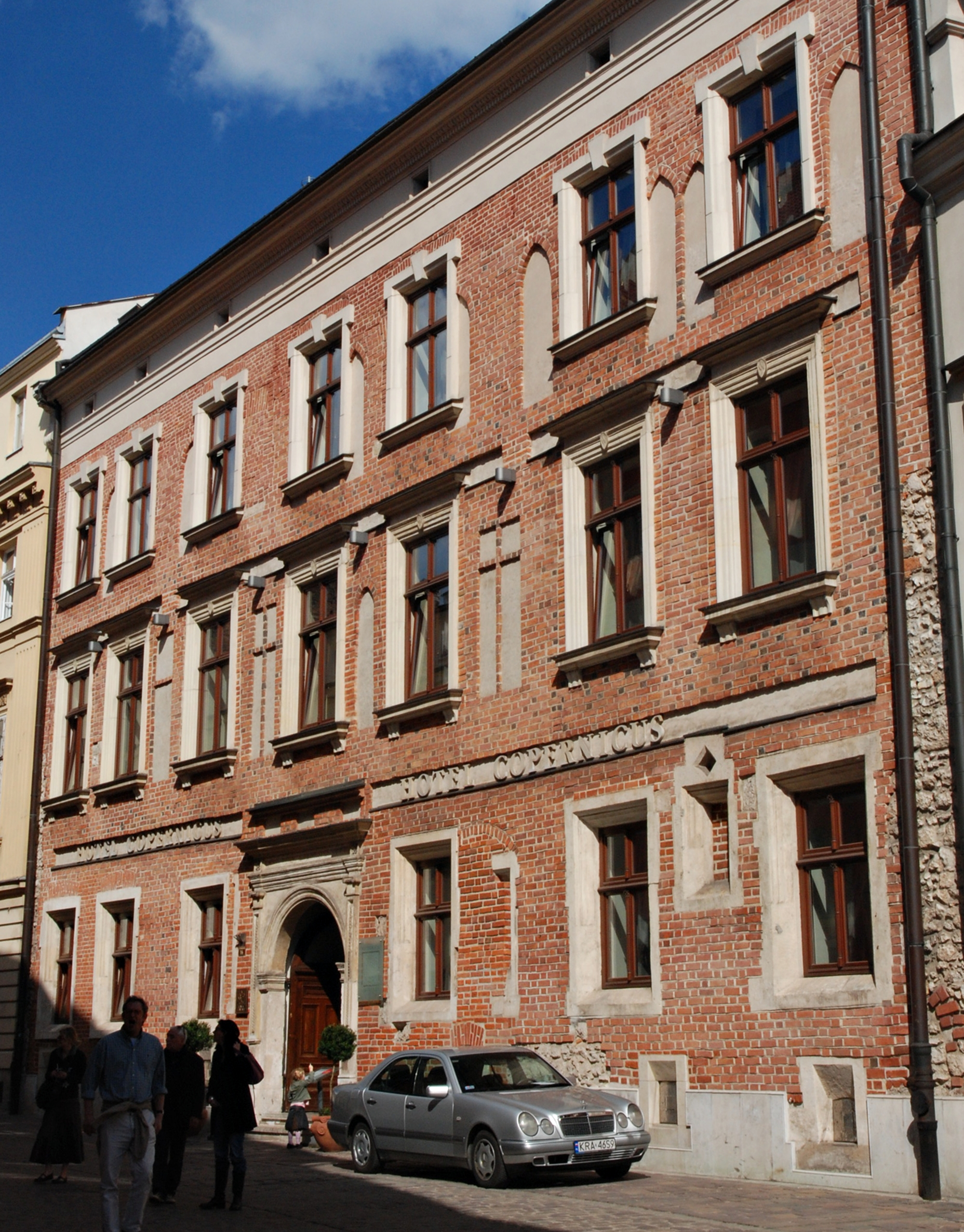
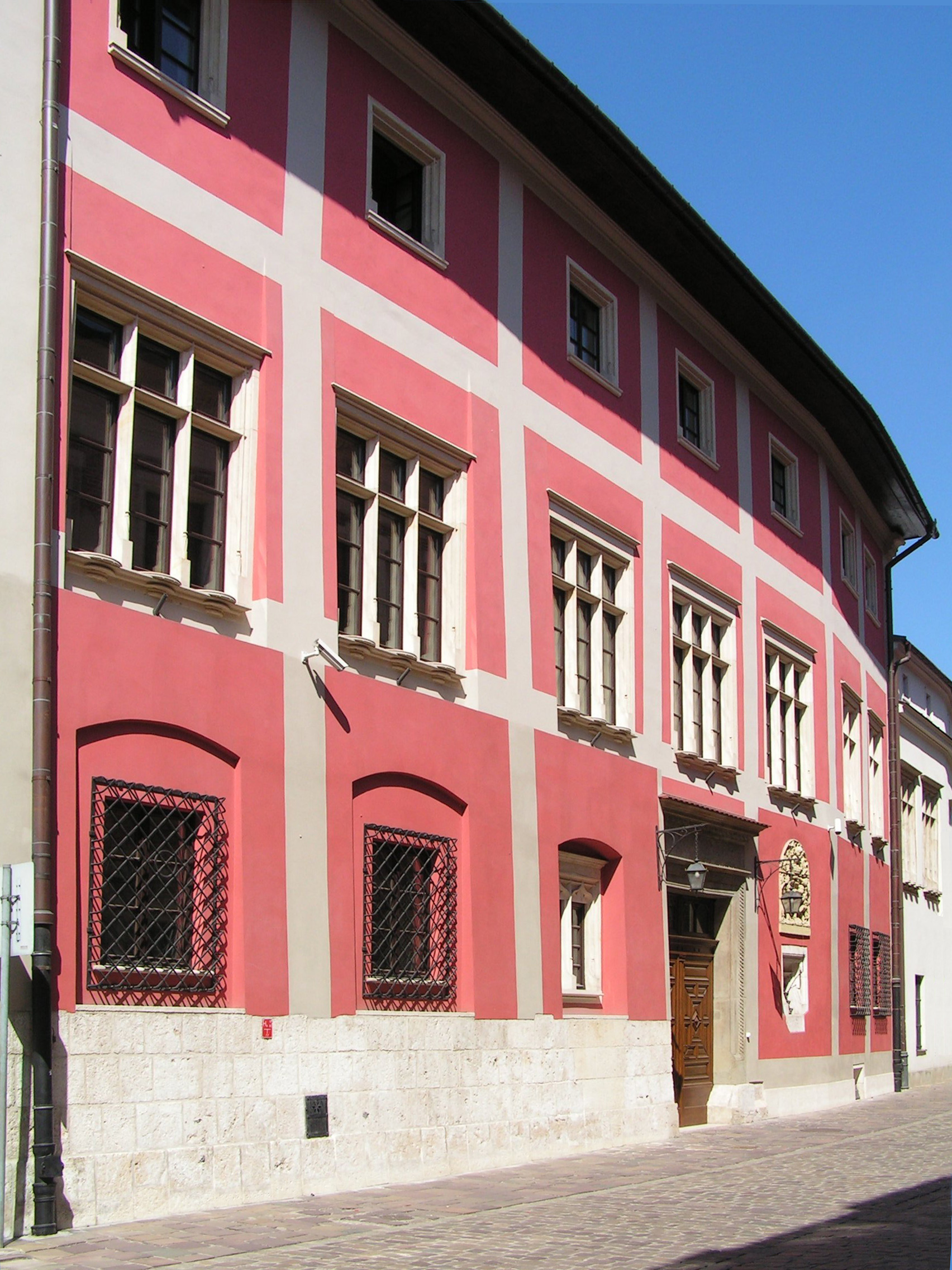
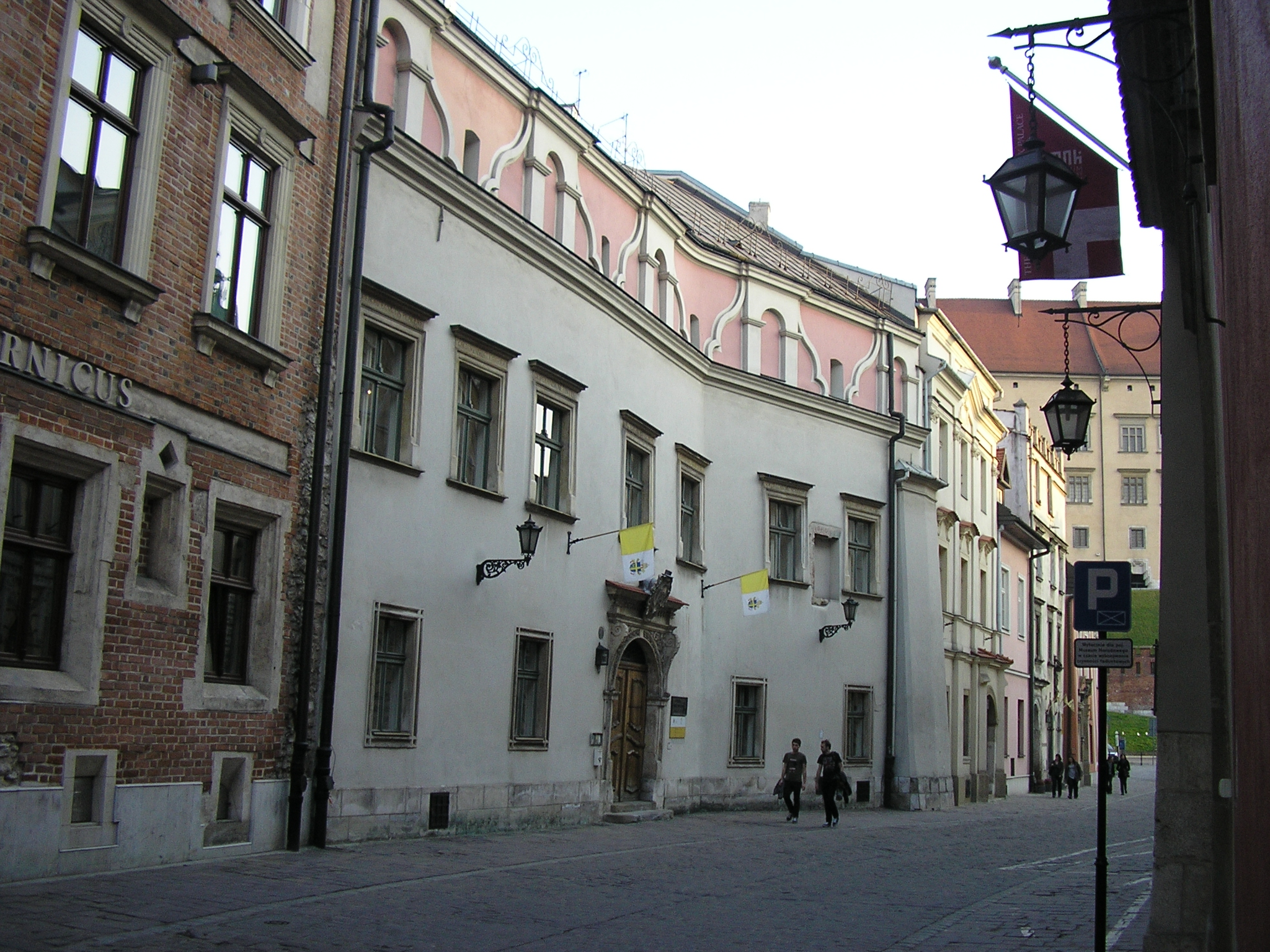
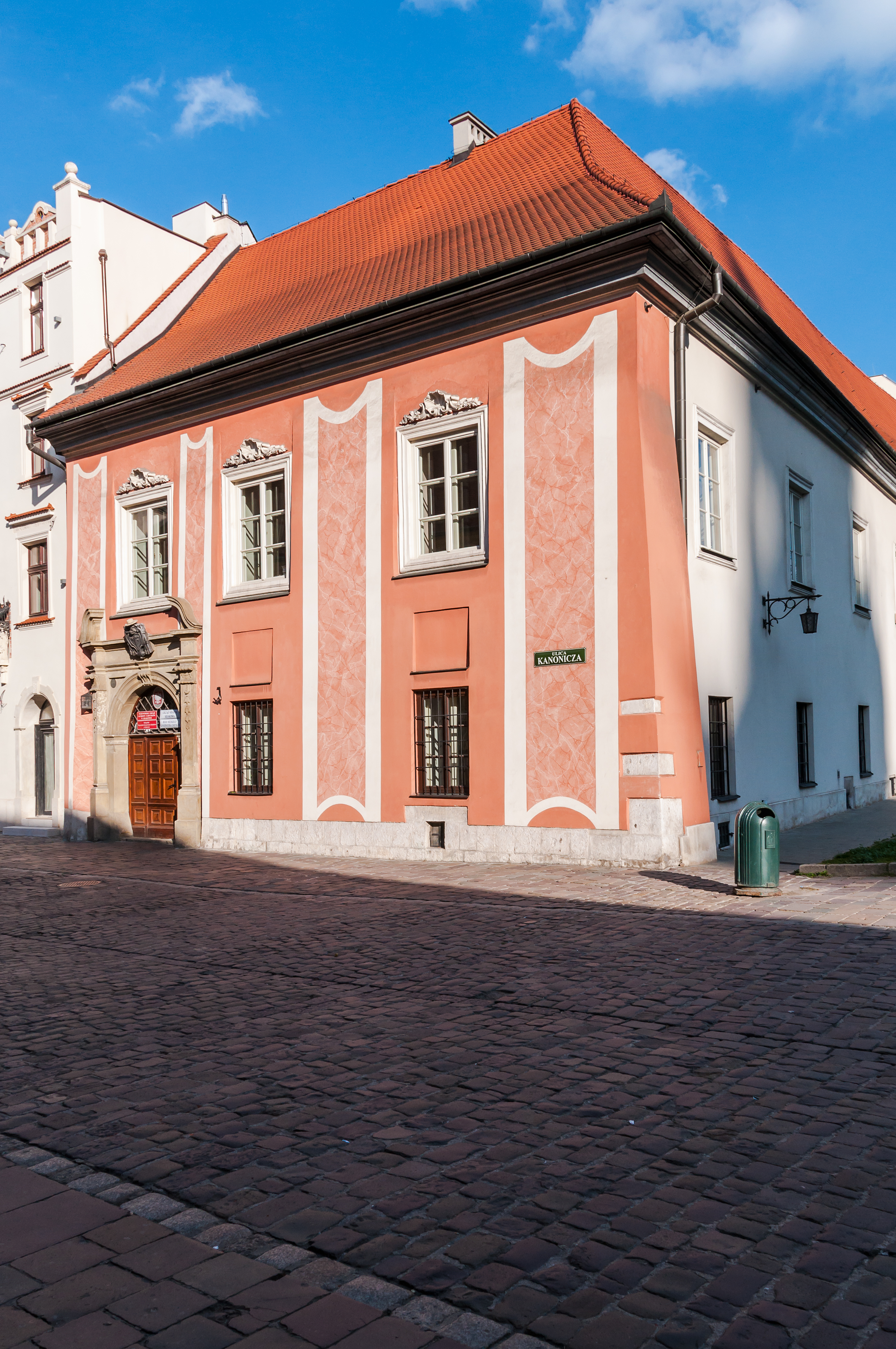
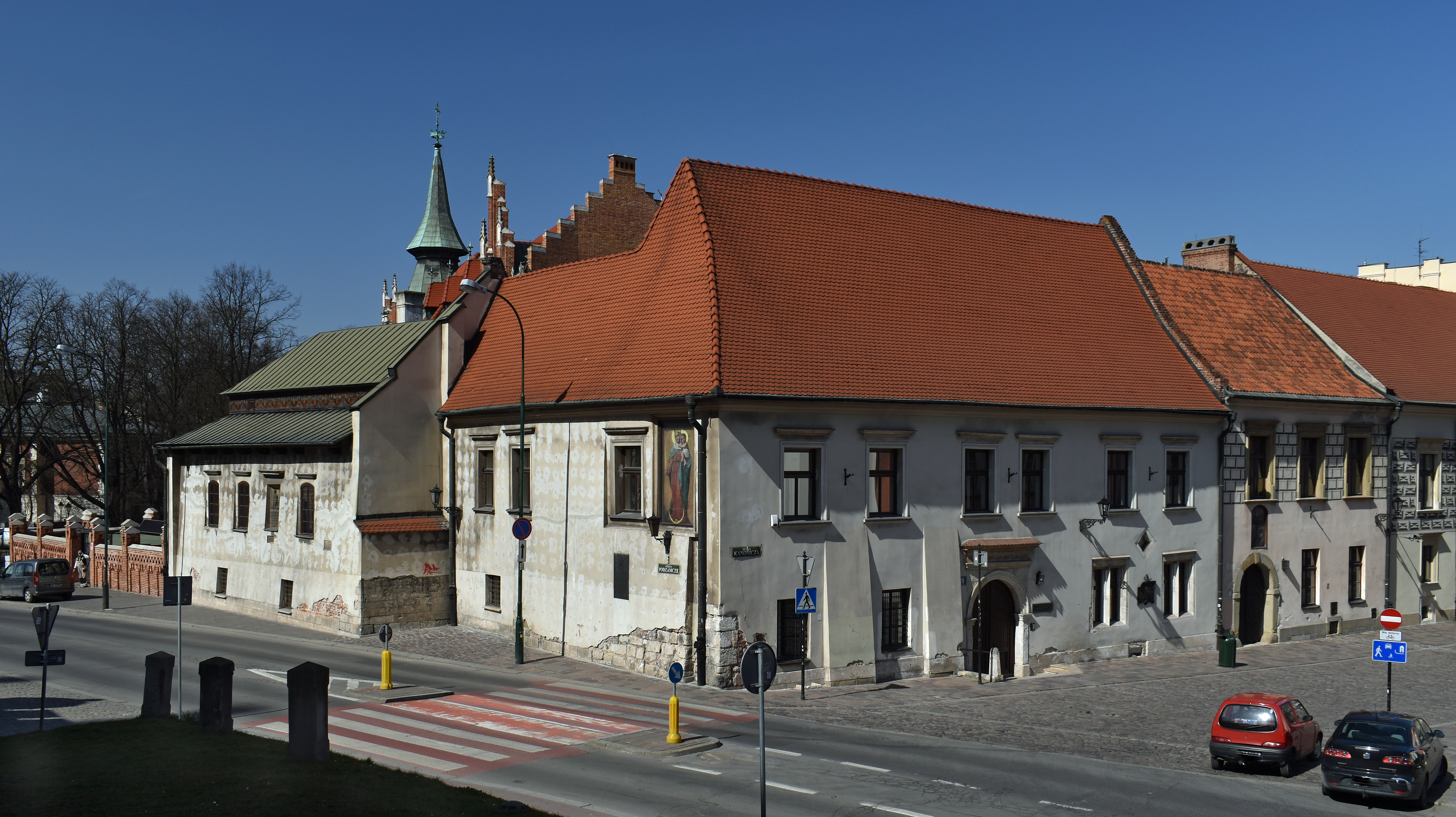
| Street No. | Short description | Picture |
|---|---|---|
| 1 | Samuel Maciejowski Palace - built in the first half of the sixteenth-century and until the eighteenth-century served as a canon's residence, also known as the Chapel of St. George. Presently, the palace houses the Faculty of Architecture of the Tadeusz Kościuszko University of Technology. |
| 2 | Angel's House - a historic townhouse from the sixteenth-century. Presently, the house serves as a private residence. |
| 6 | Knight's House - a Gothic building, formerly serving as a residence for knights. Since 1980, the building housed the Kraków Society of Friends of Fine Arts, while presently is part of the Jagiellonian University. |
| 16 | Hotel Copernicus - a historic building presently housing a 29-room hotel with two apartments. |
| 17 | Erazm Ciołek Palace - built at the turn of the fifteenth and sixteenth-century, presently housing a faculty of the National Museum. |
| 18 | Florian Mokrski Palace - built in the fourteen-century. The palace was built as residence for Florian Mokrski, a Bishop of Kraków. It became the seat of Pope John Paul II Centre "Do not be afraid" ("Nie lękajcie się"). |
| 24 | Gorków Palace - a Mannerist palace from the fifteenth-century, housing the residence for Queen Bona's secretary Andrzej Krzycki. Presently, the palace houses the Lesser Poland Voivodship Office for the Protection of Monuments. |
| 25 | Długosz House - the former residence of a cathedral canon. The building has been named by one of its later occupants, inter alia historian and diplomat Jan Długosz. Presently, the building houses the rectorate of the Pontifical University of John Paul II. |
