= Waclaw Leszczyński =

Polish archbishop

His Excellency Waclaw Leszczynski
- Archbishop of Gniezno; Primate of Poland
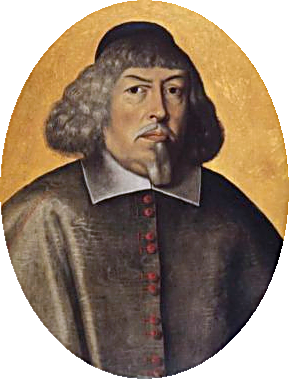
- Church: Roman Catholic
- Archdiocese: Gniezno
- Installed: 1659
- Term ended: 1666

Orders
- Ordination: December 1637
- Consecration: 1645

Personal details
- Born: 15 August 1605
- Died: 1 April 1666 (aged 60)
- Coat of arms

Wacław Leszczyński (born 15 August 1605 in Baranów; died 1 April 1666 in Łyszkowice) - Bishop of Warmia 1644–1659, Archbishop of Gniezno from 1658, Primate of Poland, Provost of the Płock cathedral chapter in 1643-1644, representative diplomatic mission of the Commonwealth in the Kingdom of France in 1645.
