= Florian Mokrski =

Polish Roman Catholic priest

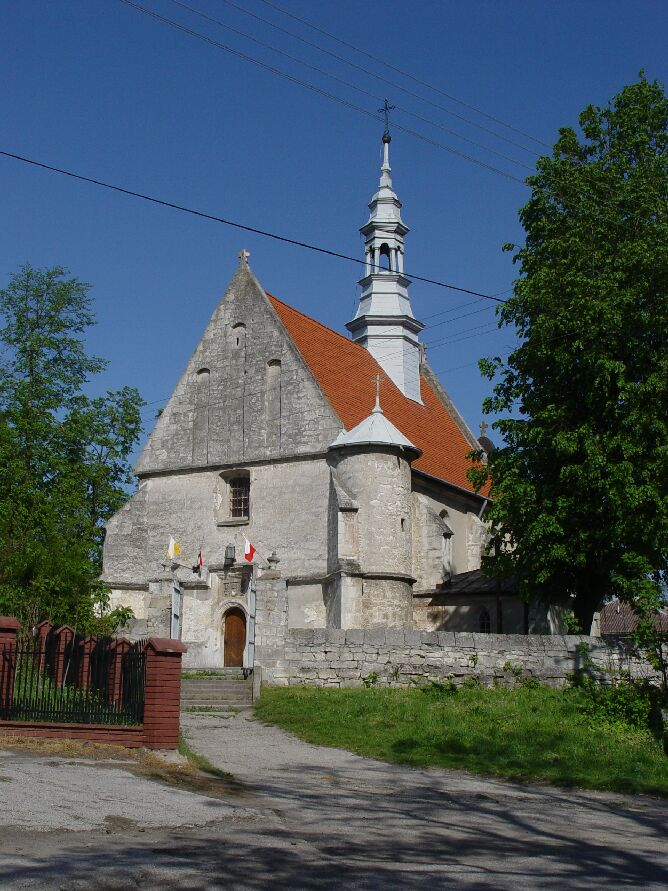
Church in Dobrowoda founded by Archbishop Floriana Mokrski

Florian Mokrski (Jelita Coat of arms) was born around 1305 and died on February 6, 1380 in Kraków) and the son of Peter Mokrski. Florian was a Polish Roman Catholic priest who served as the Archbishop of Kraków between 1367-1380. Archbishop Mokrski consecrated Polish Franciscan Andrzej Jastrzebiec the first Bishop of the Diocese of Siret in 1371.

== Sources ==
- Krzysztof Rafał Prokop, Poczet biskupów krakowskich, Wydawnictwo św. Stanisława BM, Kraków 1999, s. 64-67
- Bolesław Przybyszewski "Krótki zarys dziejów diecezji krakowskiej" t.1 wyd. Kraków 1989
- Feliks Kiryk "Nauk przemożnych perła" wyd. Kraków 1986

== See also ==
- Florian Mokrski Palace in Cracow
