= Maciej Drzewicki =

Polish archbishop

His Excellency Maciej Drzewicki
- Archbishop of Gniezno; Primate of Poland
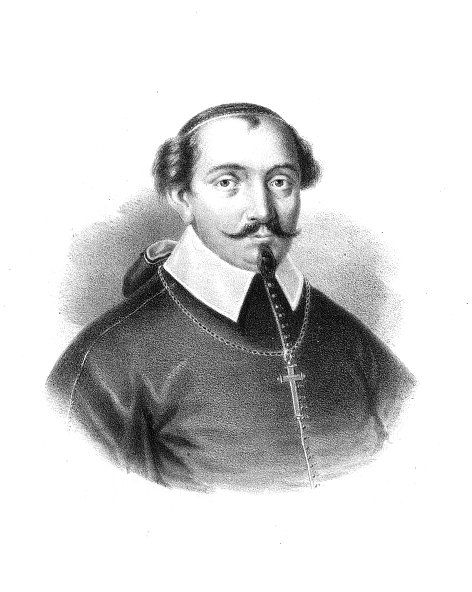
- Church: Roman Catholic
- Archdiocese: Gniezno
- Installed: 1531
- Term ended: 1535

Orders
- Ordination: unknown
- Consecration: 11 January 1505

Personal details
- Born: 22 February 1467 Drzewica
- Died: 22 August 1535 (aged 68) Łowicz
- Coat of arms

Maciej Drzewicki (22 February 1467 – 22 August 1535) was the archbishop of Gniezno and primate of Poland in 1531. He was born in Drzewica, and was a humanist. Prior to becoming archbishop, he was bishop of Włocławek in 1513 and bishop of Przemyśl in 1503.

Drzewicki began his career as a canon of Kraków in 1488. He was Krakow scholastic and secretary of the chancellery royal in 1492, and became first secretary in 1497. He was the Sandomierz cantor in 1493 and the Łęczyca scholastic in 1496. He was provost of Skalbmier in 1498 and provost at St. Florian in Kraków in 1499. He was a canon at Poznań in 1500.

Drzewicki was a Crown vice-chancellor in 1501 and became grand chancellor of the Crown in 1511. He was a royal commissioner in Gdańsk in 1524. He died in Łowicz.
