= Siege of Allenstein =

1521 siege of the Polish–Teutonic War of 1519–21

- Part of the Polish–Teutonic War (1519–21)
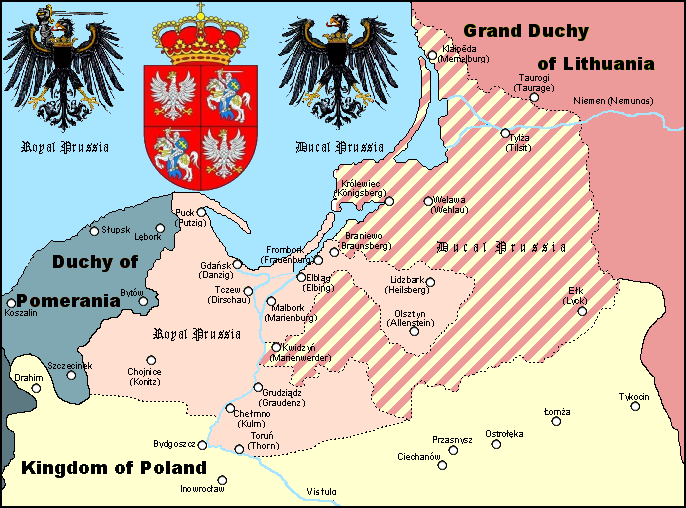
- Warmia (Ermland) surrounded by the Duchy of Prussia founded in 1525
Date	January–February 1521
Location	Allenstein, Prince-Bishopric of Warmia (Ermland)
Result	Polish victory, siege lifted

Belligerents
Kingdom of Poland	Teutonic Order

Commanders and leaders
(Kingdom of Poland) Nicolaus Copernicus	(State of the Teutonic Order) Wilhelm von Schaumber

Strength
200 infantry, several hundred dismounted cavalry	400 infantry, 600 heavy cavalry, 400 light cavalry

Casualties and losses
Unknown	Unknown

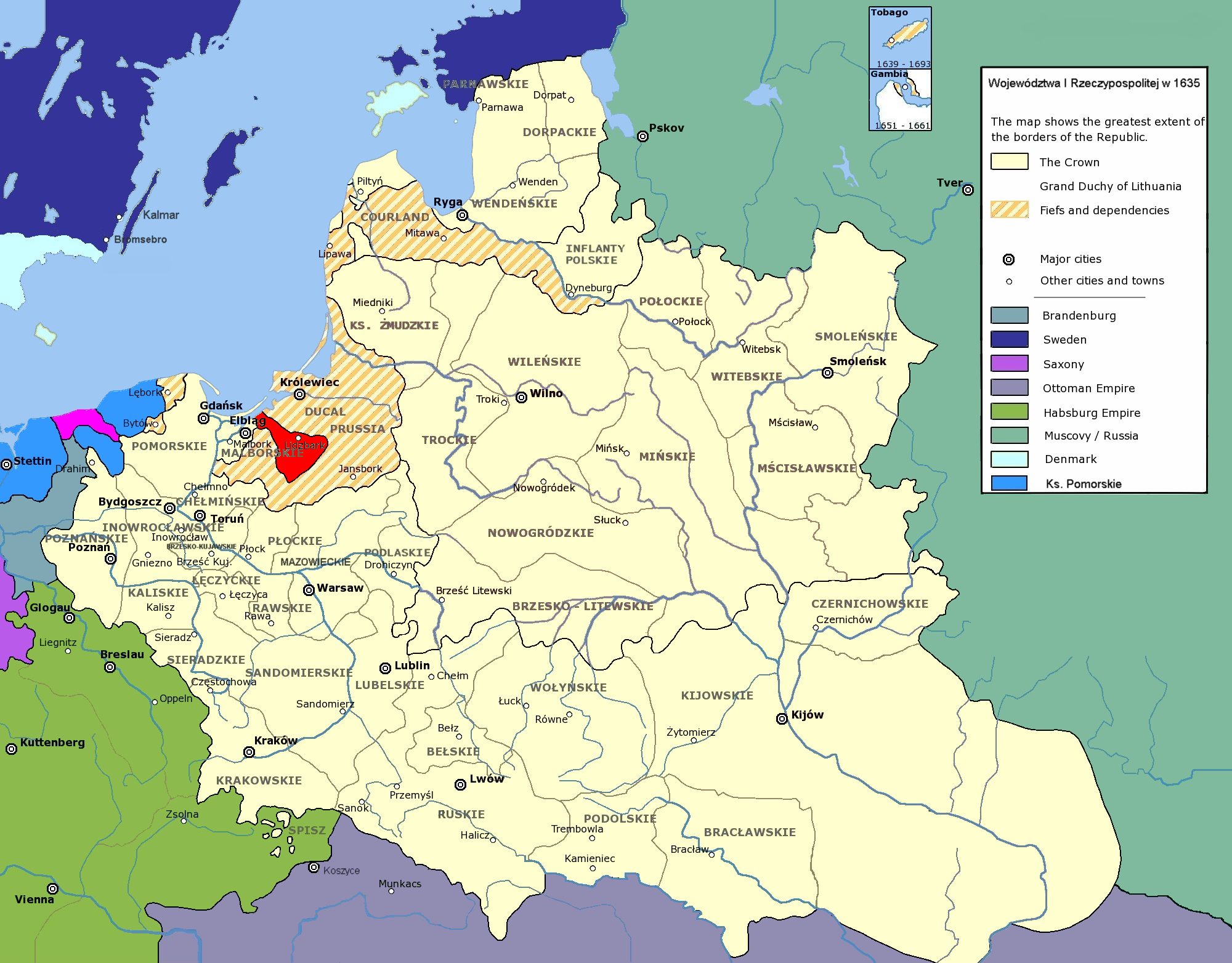
Warmia (Ermland) in the Polish–Lithuanian Commonwealth (founded 1569)

The siege of Allenstein or the siege of Olsztyn took place from January 1521 to February 1521, during the Polish–Teutonic War (1519–1521).

The town of Allenstein (Olsztyn) was defended by Polish forces against those of the Monastic Order of the Teutonic Knights. The defense of the town was successfully organized and coordinated by astronomer and scholar Nicolaus Copernicus. The Polish forces successfully resisted the Teutonic Knights, who eventually had to lift the siege. By the end of 1521 the Teutonic Knights were forced to ask for an armistice and in 1525 the Grand Master of the Order, Albrecht Hohenzollern, paid homage to the Polish king, Sigismund the Old.

== Background ==
In the 13th century, during the Northern Crusades, the region of the pagan Old Prussians had been conquered by the Monastic Order of the Teutonic Knights. In the 15th century, due to discontent with the Order's conduct, the Prussians revolted against them. In the Second Peace of Thorn, Royal Prussia became part of the Crown of the Kingdom of Poland, although with special local privileges. Royal Prussia included the Prince-Bishopric of Warmia (Ermland), which was surrounded on three sides by the Monastic state.

Nicolaus Copernicus, who was also a canon (clerical administrator), had been an administrator at Allenstein from 1516 to 1519 and was a "mainstay of resistance" to the Teutonic Knights there. In 1519, he left for Frauenburg (Frombork).

In 1511, Albrecht Hohenzollern became the Grand Master of the Teutonic Order. Like some of the previous Masters, he tried to avoid having to pay homage to the King of Poland of whom he was a vassal. As a result, in 1519 war broke out between the Teutonic Knights and the Kingdom of Poland, with the region of Warmia as a major scene of conflict.

Teutonic Order troops invaded Warmia in December 1519 with around 5,000 soldiers. In January 1520, they besieged Frauenburg, and eventually burned the whole town, including the houses of the canons (clerical administrators of Warmia) and that of Copernicus. The late arrival of Polish troops saved the town's cathedral from destruction. As a result, Copernicus was forced to move to Allenstein where he was put in charge of organizing the defense of the city against the expected attack. He improved the fortifications and stockpiled food and supplies, in the hope that the city could hold out long enough for reinforcements from the King of Poland to arrive. He sent letters to the Polish king asking for extra soldiers to strengthen the 100-man garrison.

As a further precaution, he also sent letters to Elbing (Elbląg) with a request for additional supplies and 20 cannons. The letter to the Polish king was intercepted by the knights. Sigismund, however, learned of the threat through other channels and the garrison of the town was expanded to 200 when a unit of infantry, under the leadership of the Czech commander Henryk Peryk of Janowice arrived. Another 700 cavalry under Rotmistrz Zbigniew Slupecki showed up soon after. Further supplies from Elbing, consisting of lead, salt, and 16 more artillery pieces arrived in early February.

== Siege ==
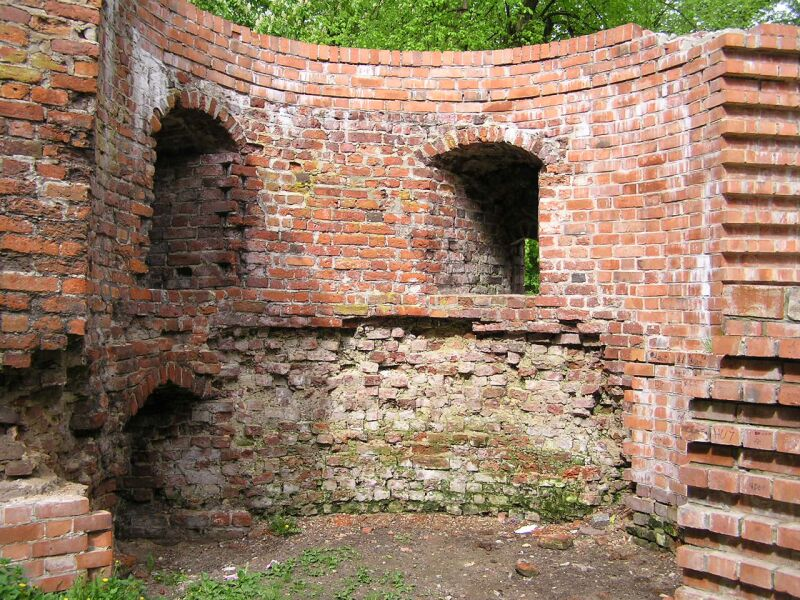
Remains of Olsztyn walls

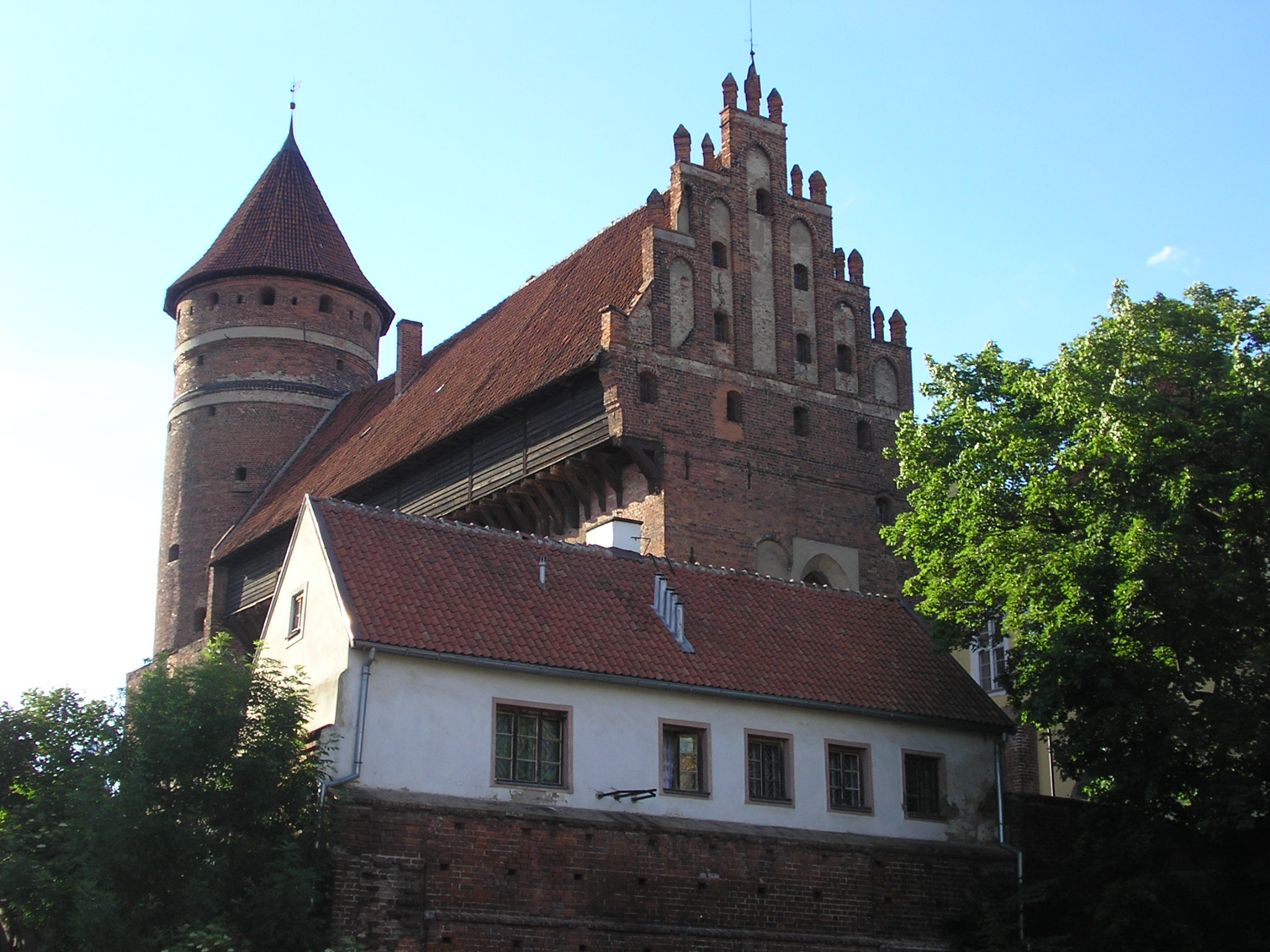
Olsztyn Castle

The Knights arrived at Allenstein on January 16, 1521, with a force of some 400 infantry, 600 heavy cavalry, 400 light cavalry, and artillery. They were met by small skirmish units whose purpose was to delay the Knights' attack for as long as possible. The Teutonic Knights demanded that the town surrender, hoping that a show of force would suffice. Copernicus, however, refused to accede to the demand.

On January 26 the Knights launched their assault on the town, led by Wilhelm von Schaumber, near the Brama Młyńska (Mill Gate). The Knights managed to approach the walls across the frozen moat and broke through the gate. They hoped to surprise the town's defenders. An alarm was sounded, however, and Polish soldiers rushed to the breach in the gate. According to Jerzy Sikorski (a Polish historian who played a large part in locating Copernicus’ grave), Copernicus probably came out onto the walls and personally directed the Polish defense of the town. The attack was repulsed, and the Teutonic Knights’ assault force was forced to withdraw.

== Aftermath ==
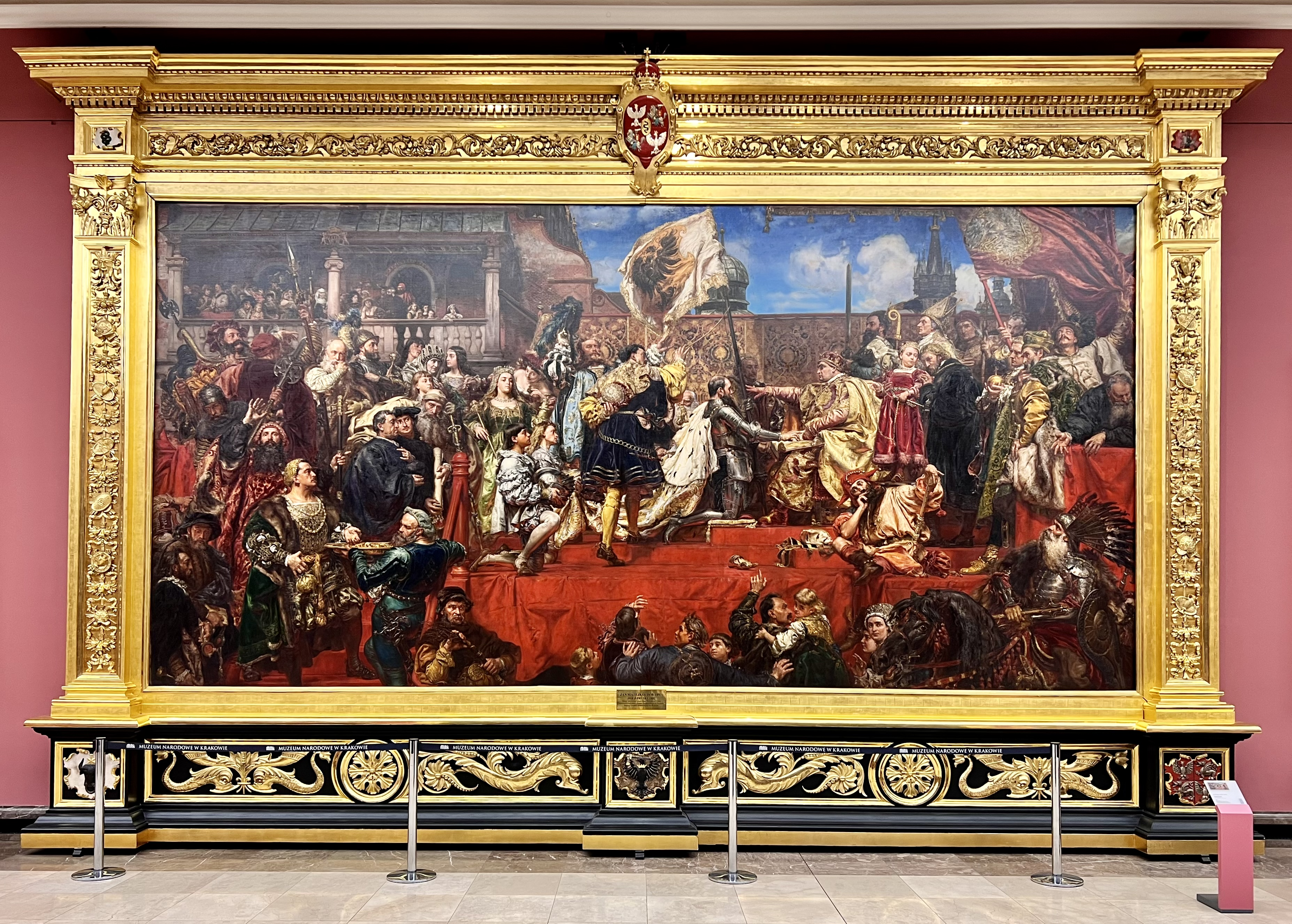
The Prussian Homage, by Matejko

By the end of February, with the arrival of additional reinforcements from Elbing, the Teutonic Knights were forced to abandon their siege. By the end of 1521, due to lack of funds to continue the war, and the threat of a large Polish army approaching, they were forced to negotiate with the Polish King. Copernicus represented the Polish side in the armistice negotiations.

This was the last time that the Teutonic Knights invaded Warmia.

The war ended in 1525, and on April 10 of that year Albrecht Hohenzollern, now converted to Lutheranism, paid homage to Polish King Sigismund I as a vassal, in what has become known as "the Prussian Homage." According to the Treaty of Kraków, in return, Albrecht received the eastern portion of Prussia, which became known as Ducal Prussia, in fief from Poland, as a secular duchy, while the western portion, Royal Prussia, together with Warmia, remained under the Polish crown.
