= Polish–Teutonic War (1519–1521) =

Military conflict

Polish–Teutonic War of 1519–1521
Date	1519–1521
Location	Monastic State of the Teutonic Knights
Result	Polish victory
Territorial changes	Treaty of Kraków

Belligerents
Teutonic Knights	Kingdom of Poland

Commanders and leaders
Albert of Hohenzollern	Sigismund I the Old; Mikołaj Firlej; Nicolaus Copernicus

Strength
Tens of thousands, but likely under 50,000	Tens of thousands, but likely under 50,000

The Polish–Teutonic War of 1519–1521 (German: Reiterkrieg, lit. 'Rider's War', Polish: Wojna pruska, lit. 'Prussian War') was fought between the Kingdom of Poland and the Teutonic Knights, ending with the Compromise of Thorn in April 1521. Four years later, under the Treaty of Kraków, part of the Catholic Monastic State of the Teutonic Order became secularized as the Duchy of Prussia. The reigning Grand Master Albert of Hohenzollern-Brandenburg-Ansbach became the first Duke of Prussia by paying the Prussian Homage as vassal to his uncle, Polish king and grand Duke of Lithuania, Sigismund I the Old (1467–1548, reigned 1506–1548).

== Prelude ==
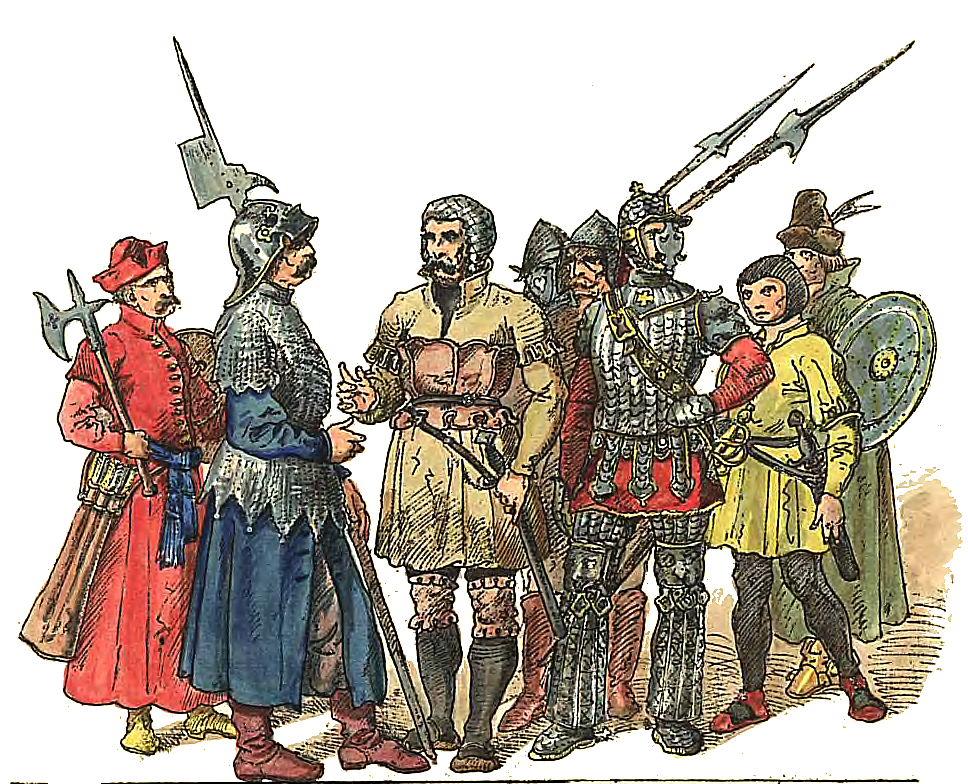
16th-century Polish soldiers, depicted by Jan Matejko

After the Second Peace of Thorn (1466), the Teutonic Order was under Polish suzerainty. In the late 1490s, the Order developed the idea of electing only an Imperial Prince as future Grand Master, who as subject to the Emperor could resist having to pay homage to Kings of Poland. The Order was present not only in Prussia but throughout the Empire, and it was also subordinate to the Holy Roman Emperor, who had objected since 1501 to Duke Frederick of Saxony, Grand Master of the Teutonic Order and Reichsfürst, offering tribute to the Polish king.

Frederick died in December 1510, and Albert of Hohenzollern was chosen as his successor early in 1511 in the hope that his relationship to his maternal uncle, Sigismund I the Old, Grand Duke of Lithuania and King of Poland, would facilitate a settlement of the disputes over eastern Prussia. The new Grand Master, aware of his duties to the empire and to the papacy, refused to submit to the crown of Poland. As war over the Order's existence appeared inevitable, Albert made strenuous efforts to secure allies and carried on protracted negotiations with Emperor Maximilian I.

In the meantime, however, the Order had been looking for other allies. In 1512, Muscovy invaded the Grand Duchy of Lithuania, which was in personal union with Poland. The Order was supposed to help the Duchy, but it refused, angering Sigismund I. In 1517, the Teutonic Order signed an alliance with Vasili III of Muscovy. Albert now felt he held the upper hand and demanded from the Polish king the return of Royal Prussia and Warmia territories, as well as a large remuneration for "Polish occupation" of those territories. In response, first the diet of Prussia (Landtag or sejmik), and then, in December 1519, the Polish General Sejm, declared that a state of war existed between the Polish Kingdom and the Order. Lithuania refused to aid Poland, however, as it was focused on the Muscovite threat.

== War ==
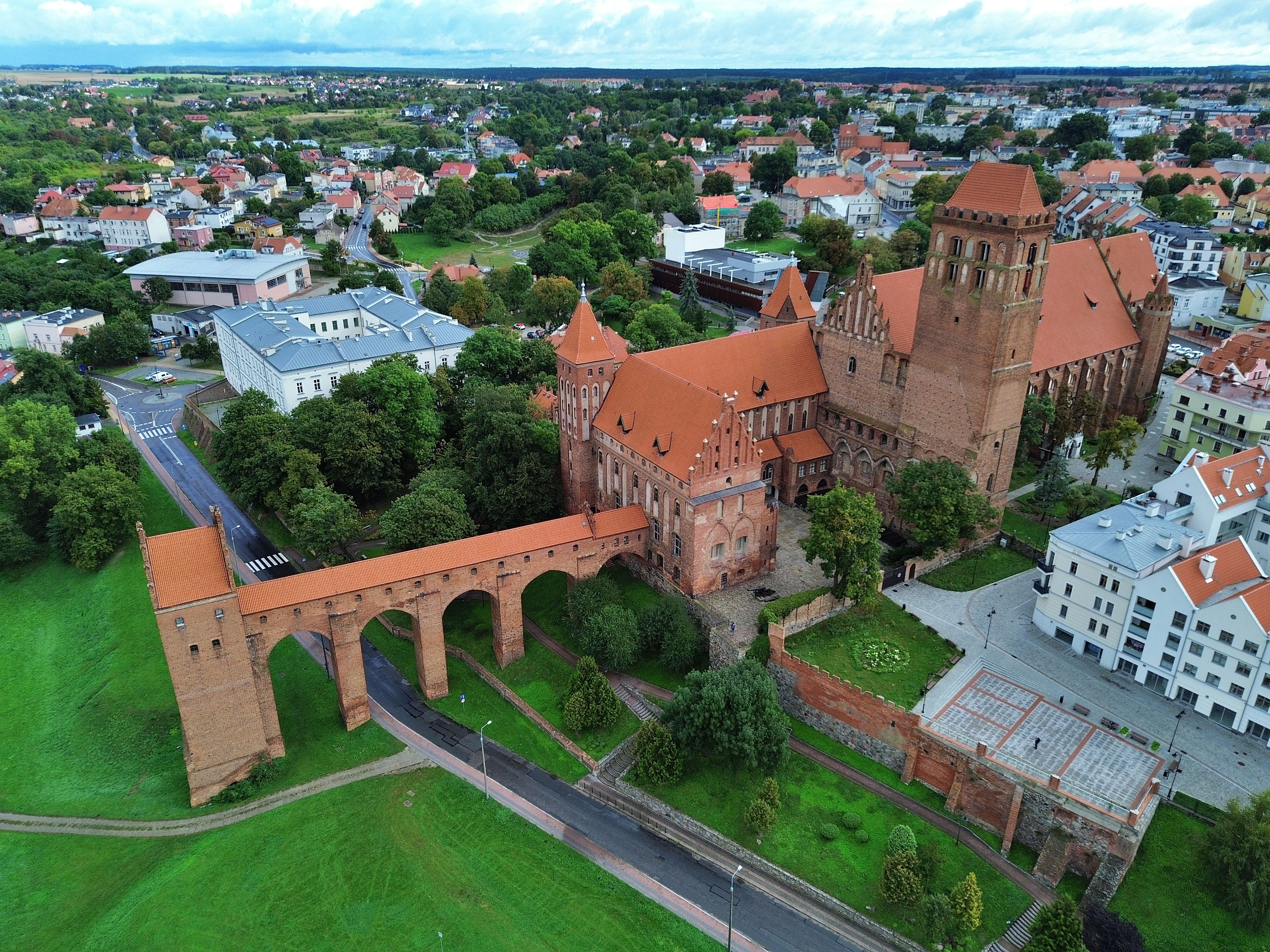
Marienwerder Castle was taken by Polish forces on 18 March 1520.

Polish forces under Grand Crown Hetman Mikołaj Firlej gathered near Koło and in January struck towards Pomesania towards Königsberg, laying siege to Marienwerder (now Kwidzyn) and Preußisch Holland (now Pasłęk). The siege was slow, however, since the Polish forces lacked artillery power. The Polish fleet began a blockade of Teutonic ports. The Knights, in the meantime, took the Warmian city of Braunsberg (now Braniewo). The Polish army received artillery reinforcements in April and took Marienwerder and Preußisch Holland that month, but failed to retake Braunsberg.

The war grew, with Polish forces from the Duchy of Masovia and Gdańsk striking the nearby Teutonic fortifications. Teutonic forces were on defense, waiting for reinforcements from Germany, which arrived in the summer of 1520. In July, the Teutonic army started an offensive, attacking Masovia, Warmia, and Łomża territories, laying siege to Lidzbark Warmiński. In August, another group of German reinforcements attacked Greater Poland, taking Międzyrzecz. The Germans took Wałcz, Chojnice, Starogard Gdański, and Tczew and started a siege of Gdańsk, but they retreated when faced with Polish reinforcements and plagued by financial troubles (German reinforcements, mostly mercenaries, refused to fight until paid). Polish forces retook Tczew, Starogard, and Chojnice. The Teutonic Knights retreated towards Oliwa and Puck, pursued by Polish forces. The Polish side was then struck with financial troubles, and the "pospolite ruszenie" forces were also tired. The Teutonic Knights seized their chance and launched a counteroffensive, taking Nowe Miasto Lubawskie and approaching Płock and Olsztyn. Olsztyn was successfully defended by the Poles under the command of Nicolaus Copernicus.

At that point, the Ottoman Empire invaded Hungary, and the new Holy Roman Emperor, Charles V, demanded that the Teutonic Knights and Poles stop their hostilities and aid the defense of Europe against the infidels. Both sides, tired with the war, agreed to an armistice on 5 April 1521 in the Compromise of Thorn.

== Aftermath ==
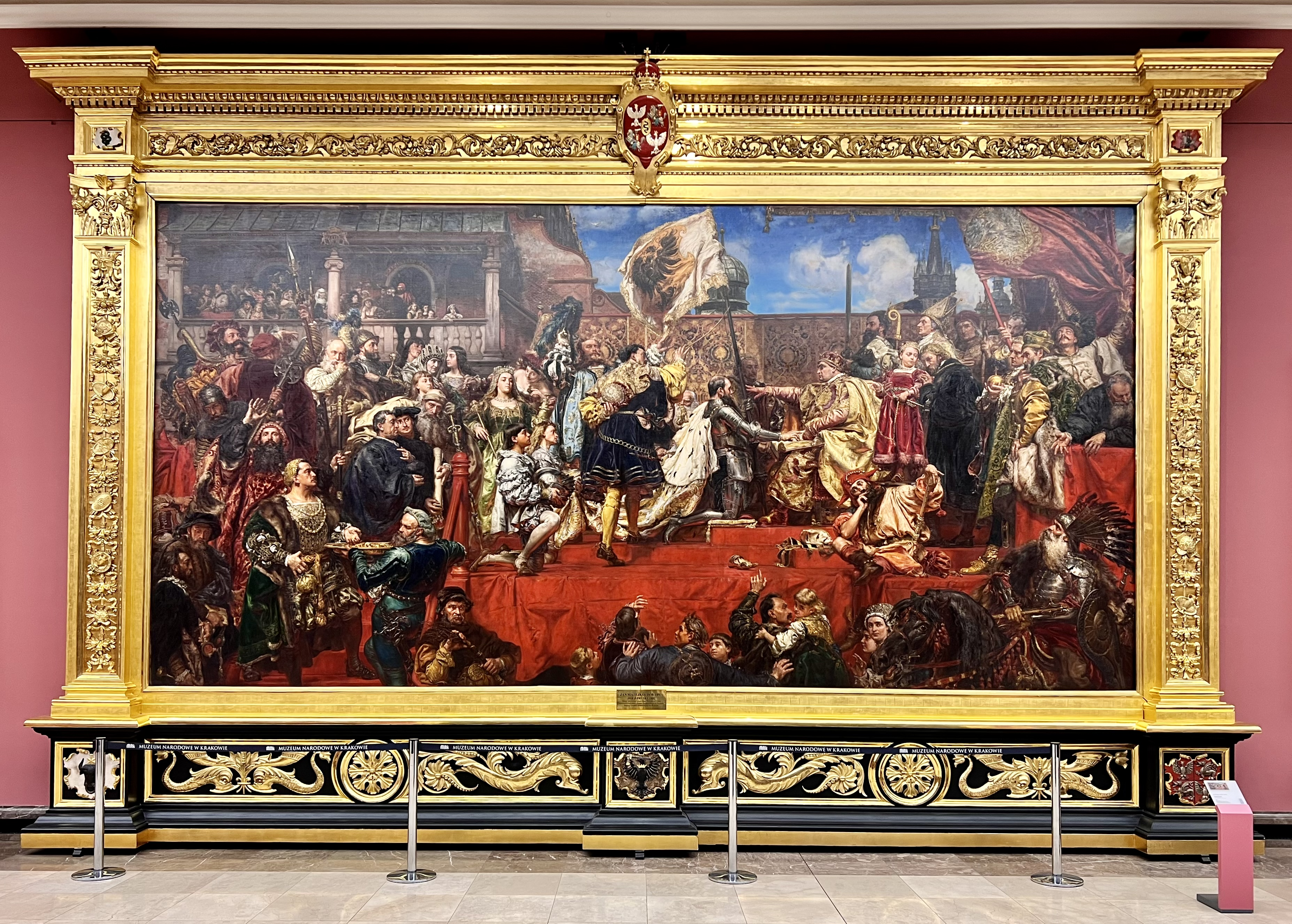
Prussian Homage by Jan Matejko

During the four-year truce, the dispute was referred to Emperor Charles V and other princes, but no settlement was reached. Albert continued his efforts to obtain help in view of the inevitable end of the truce.

Eventually, in the town Wittenberg, Saxony, Albert met and was advised by Dr. Martin Luther (1483–1546), to abandon the rules of his Order, to marry, and to convert Prussia into a hereditary duchy for himself. Albert agreed and converted to Protestantism of Evangelical Lutheranism in 1525. He resigned from the Hochmeister office to assume from his uncle, the King of Poland and Grand Duke of Lithuania, Sigismund I the Old (1467–1548, reigned 1506–1548), the Prussian Homage, the hereditary rights to the now-secularized Duchy of Prussia, as a vassal, pledging loyalty to the Polish Crown. The Prussian Landtag diet assembled in the Baltic Sea port town of Königsberg, where all "Stände", led by the influential Bishop of Samland George of Polentz, embraced both the new Duke and Protestant Reformation to Lutheran faith. Thus the Order was ousted after facing a century of opposition by the Prussian Confederation. The Order elected a new Grand Master who tried to fight the loss of power in the Prussian territories by political means, but could never regain any influence there.

== See also ==
- Siege of Allenstein
