= Bishopric of Pomesania =

Roman Catholic titular see in Poland

Diocese of Pomesania Dioecesis Pomesaniensis
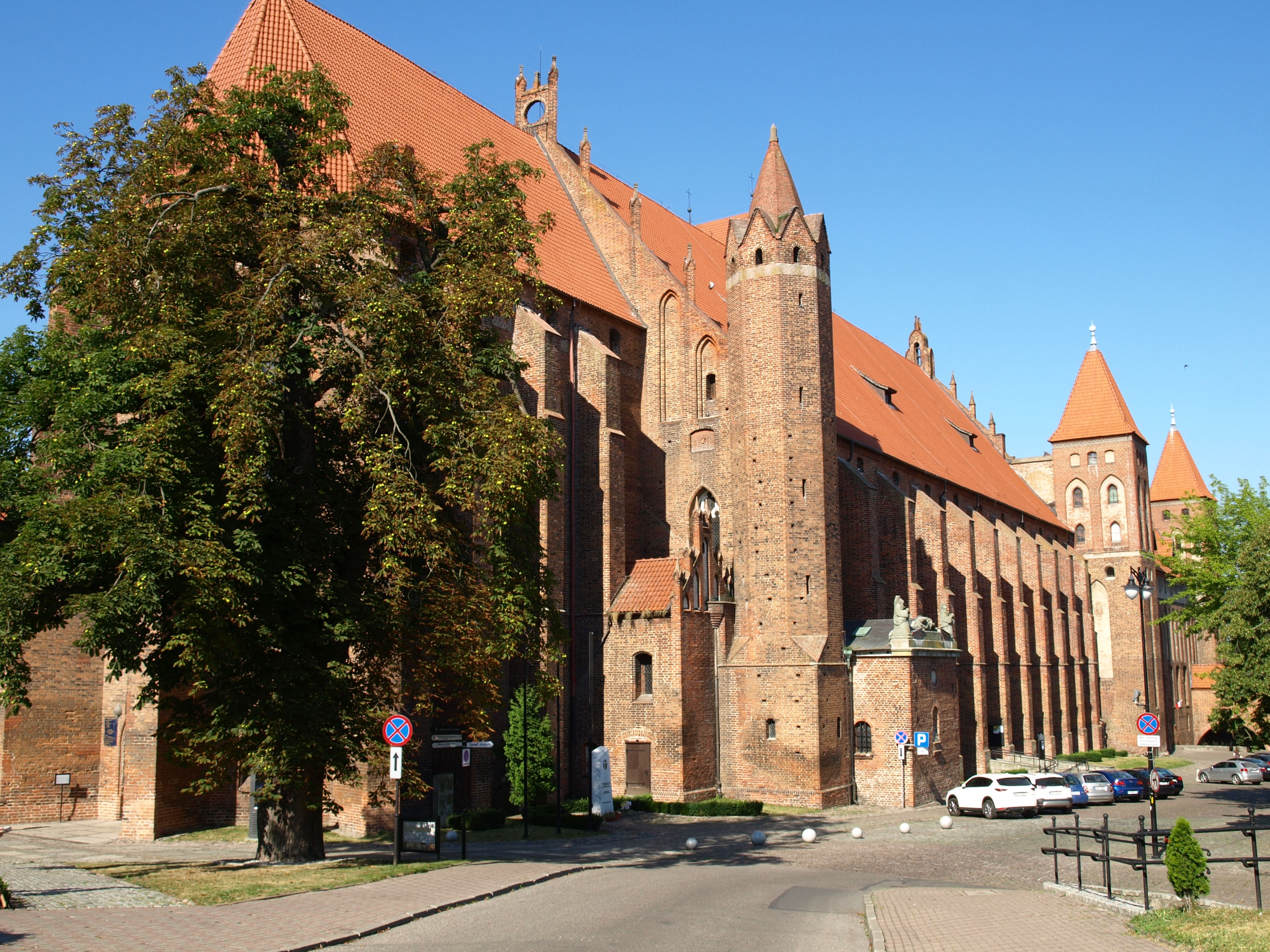
- Former Cathedral in Kwidzyn, now Co-Cathedral of the Diocese of Elbląg

- Coat of arms

Location
- Ecclesiastical province: Riga

Information
- Denomination: Roman Catholic
- Rite: Latin Rite
- Established: 1243
- Dissolved: 16th century
- Cathedral: Kwidzyn Cathedral

Leadership
- Pope: Leo XIV
- Bishop: Adam Wodarczyk

The Bishopric of Pomesania (German: Bistum Pomesanien; Polish: Diecezja pomezańska) was a Catholic diocese in the Prussian regions of Pomesania and Pogesania, in modern northern Poland until the 16th century, then shortly a Lutheran diocese, and became a Latin titular see.

The former Cathedral and Castle of Pomesanian Cathedral Chapter complex in Kwidzyn is listed as a Historic Monument of Poland.

== Catholic diocese ==
Banner used in the Battle of Grunwald (1410)

It was founded as one of four Roman Catholic dioceses in Prussia in 1243 by the papal legate William of Modena.

The bishops, whose seat was Riesenburg (Prabuty), ruled one third of diocesan territory as his temporality. The diocesan cathedral chapter met in the fortified cathedral of Marienwerder (Kwidzyn). In the 1280s the Teutonic Order succeeded to impose the simultaneous membership of all capitular canons in the Order thus winning influence in the diocese and in the capitular elections of the bishops. So the temporality of Pomesania's bishop did not develop the status of a prince-bishopric and was ruled as part of Teutonic Prussia. In 1454, the region was incorporated by King Casimir IV Jagiellon into the Kingdom of Poland upon the request of the anti-Teutonic Prussian Confederation. The Bishop and canons of Pomesania pledged allegiance to the Polish King during the incorporation in March 1454 in Kraków. After the subsequent Thirteen Years' War (1454–1466) between Poland and the Teutonic Order, the region was recognized as part of Poland as a fief held by the Teutonic Knights.

Beginning in 1523 during the Protestant Reformation, the diocese was effectively administered by Lutheran bishops until 1587, when the diocese was secularized by the regent of Ducal Prussia, George Frederick.

However the Catholic diocese was only formally suppressed in 1763, having remained vacant since 1524 except for 'temporary' Apostolic administrators since 1601.

The diocesan area outside of Ducal Prussia remained Catholic and on 1601.04.19 joined the Roman Catholic Diocese of Chełmno.

=== Catholic resident bishops ===
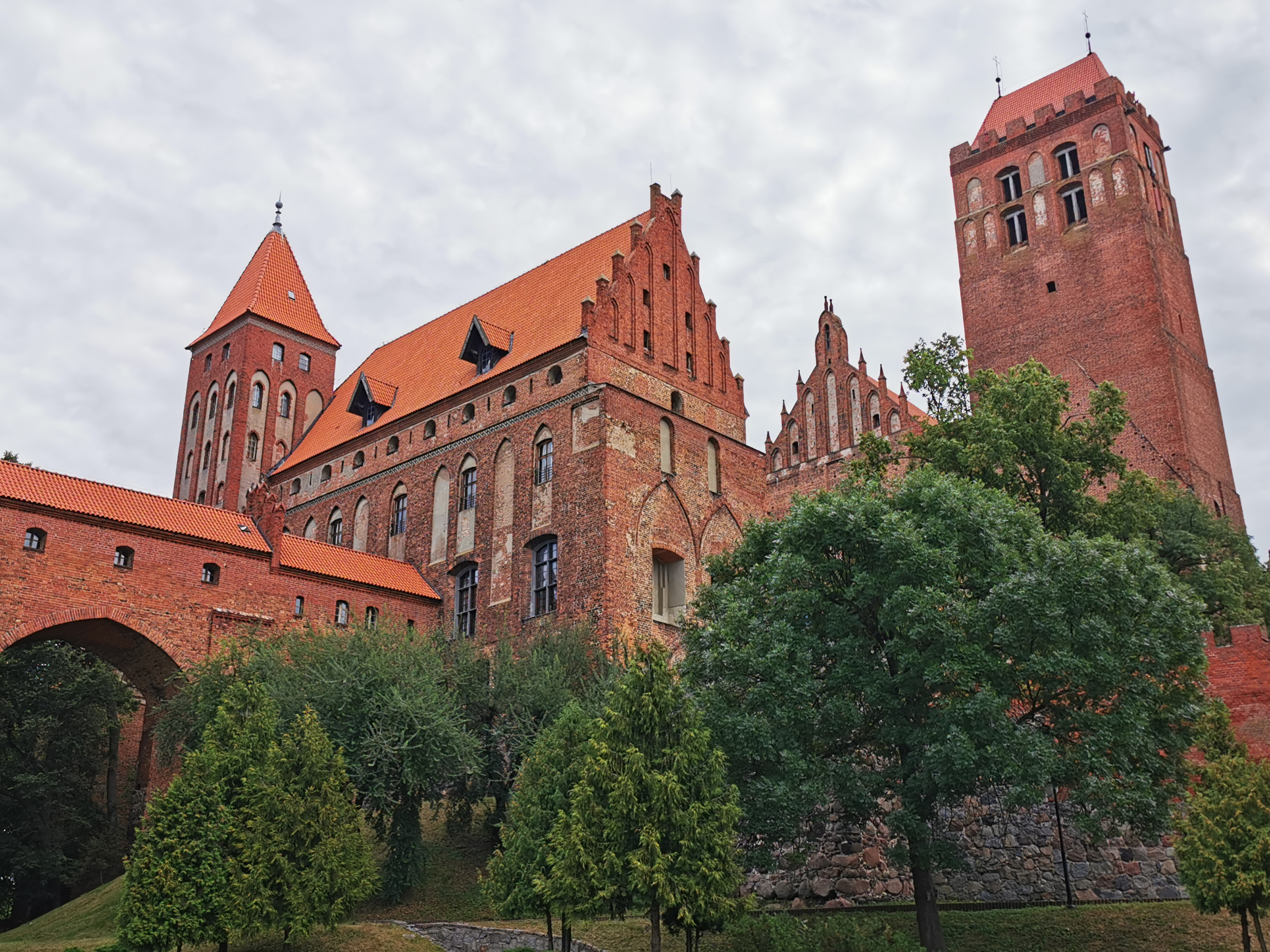
Castle of Pomesanian Cathedral Chapter in Kwidzyn

- Ernst, Dominican Order (O.P.) (1248/49– death 1259?60)
- Albert Friars Minor (O.F.M.) (1259? – death 1285?86)
  - Heinrich (1277/78–1292) (Counter bishop)
- Heinrich von Pomesanien (1286 – death 1303)
- Christian (1303.05.16 – death 1306.07.22)
- Ludeko von Pomesanien = Lutho von Baldersheim (1319.12.03 – death 1321.08.28)
- Rudolf (1322.03.05 – death 1332)
- Bertold von Riesenburg (1332 – death 1346.11.28?)
- Arnold (1347.06.04 – death 1360.01.29?)
- Nikolaus von Radam (1360.04.20 – death 1376.11.27)
- Johannes Mönch (1378.02.16 – death 1409.03.07)
- Johannes Rymann (1409.07.24 – death 1417.09.04)
- Gerhard Stolpmann (1418.05.09 – death 1427.07.22)
- Johannes von Mewe = Johann von Heilsberg (1427.10.13 – death 1440.07.18)
- Kaspar Linke (1440 – death 1463.10.28)
- Nikolaus II (1464–1466)
- Wincenty Kiełbasa (1467–1478)
- Johannes Christiani von Lessen = Johann Christian von Lessen (1480.04.14 – death 1501.04.10)
- Hiob von Dobeneck (1501–1521), Teutonic order( O.T.) (1501.08.27 – 1521.05.25)
- ? George of Polentz (1521–1523)
- Apostolic Administrator Achille Grassi (1521.08.09 – 1523.11.22), also/previously Bishop of Città di Castello (Italy) (1506.02.14 – 1515), created Cardinal-Priest of S. Sisto (1511.03.17 – 1517.07.06), Bishop of Bologna (Italy) (1511.05.30 – 1518.01.08), Camerlengo of Sacred College of Cardinals (1517 – 1518.01.08), transferred Cardinal-Priest of S. Maria in Trastevere (1517.07.06 – death 1523.11.22), also Apostolic Administrator of above diocese Bologna (1518.03.03 – 1523.11.22)
  - Erhard von Queis (apparently no proper papal mandate- cfr. infra) (1523 – 1524)

=== Catholic Apostolic administrators ===
- Nicolò Ridolfi (1523.11.22 – ?; cfr. supra), while Cardinal-Deacon of Ss. Vito e Modesto in Macello Martyrum (1517.07.06 – 1534.01.19) and Apostolic Administrator of Diocese of Orvieto (Italy) (1520.08.24 – 1529.09.03); later Metropolitan Archbishop of Archdiocese of Firenze (Italy) (1524.01.11 – 1532.10.11), Apostolic Administrator of Diocese of Vicenza (Italy) (1524.03.14 – 1550.01.31), Apostolic Administrator of Diocese of Forli (Italy) (1526.04.16 – 1528.08.07), Apostolic Administrator of Diocese of Tuscanella (1532.11.16 – 1533.06.06), Apostolic Administrator of Diocese of Viterbo (Italy) (1532.11.16 – 1533.06.06), Apostolic Administrator of Archdiocese of Salerno (Italy) (1533.02.07 – 1548.12.19), Apostolic Administrator of Roman Catholic Diocese of Imola, (Italy) (1533.08.04 – 1546.05.17), transferred Cardinal-Deacon of S. Maria in Cosmedin (1534.01.19 – 1540.05.31), Apostolic Administrator of Diocese of Tuscanella (1538.08.08 – 1548.05.25), Apostolic Administrator of Diocese of Viterbo (Italy) (1538.08.08 – 1548.05.25), transferred Cardinal-Deacon of S. Maria in Via Lata (1540.05.31 – death 1550.01.31), Protodeacon of Sacred College of Cardinals (1540.05.31 – 1550.01.31), (again) Metropolitan Archbishop of Firenze (1543.01.08 – 1548.05.25)

The apostolic administration was thereafter vested in many nearly successive Bishops of the Roman Catholic Diocese of Chełmno

- Wawrzyniec Gembicki (1601.04.19 – 1610.04.19) while Bishop of Chełmno (Poland) (1600.11.10 – 1610.04.19); later Bishop of Kujawy–Pomorze (Poland) (1610.04.19 – 1616.03.14), Metropolitan Archbishop of Gniezno and Primate of Poland (1616.03.14 – death 1624.02.10)
- Maciej Konopacki (1611–1613), while Bishop of Chełmno (Poland)
- Jan Kuczborski (1614–1624) while Bishop of Chełmno (Poland)
- Jakub Zadzik (1624.12.02 – 1635.11.29) while Bishop of Chełmno; later Bishop of Kraków (Poland) (1635.11.29 – death 1642.03.17)
- Jan Lipski (1636–1639) while Bishop of Chełmno (1636 – 1639); later Metropolitan Archbishop of Gniezno and Primate of Poland (1639 – death 1641)
- Kasper Działyński (1639–1646) while Bishop of Chełmno (Poland)
- Andrzej Leszczyński (1646.12.03 – 1653.01.08) while Bishop of Chełmno (Poland) ([1646.05.04] 1646.12.03 – 1653.01.08); previously Bishop of Kamieniec Podolski (Poland) (1641.12.16 – 1646.12.03); later Metropolitan Archbishop of Gniezno and Primate of Poland (1653.01.08 – 1658.04.15)
- Jan Gembicki (1653.04.21 – 1655.05.11) while Bishop of Chełmno; next Bishop of Płock (Poland) (1655.05.11 – 1674.03.13), Bishop of Kujawy–Pomorze (Poland) (1674.03.13 – death 1675.03)
- Adam Kos (1657.11.11 – death 1661.02.11) while Bishop of Chełmno
- Andrzej Olszowski (1661.08.08 – 1674.10.01) while Bishop of Chełmno (1661.02.23] 1661.08.08 – 1674.06.26); next Metropolitan Archbishop of Gniezno and Primate of Poland ([1674.06.26] 1674.10.01 – 1677.08.29)
- Jan Kazimierz Opaliński, Cistercians (O. Cist.) (1681.11.17 – death 1693.07.22) while Bishop of Chełmno (1681.06.23] 1681.11.17 – 1693.07.22); previously Titular Bishop of Diocletiana (1680.01.08 – 1681.11.17) as Coadjutor Bishop of Poznań (Poland) (1680.01.08 – 1681.11.17)
- Kazimierz Szczuka (1693.10.05 – death 1694.06.30) while Bishop of Chełmno ([1693.10.02] 1693.10.05 – 1694.06.30)
- Teodor Andrzej Potocki (1699.04.11 – 1712.06.10) while Bishop of Chełmno; later Bishop of Warmia (Poland) ([1711.11.16] 1712.06.10 – 1723.11.22), Apostolic Administrator of Diocese of Sambia (Prussia) (1712.06.10 – 1723.11.22), Metropolitan Archbishop of Gniezno and Primate of Poland ([1723.01.09] 1723.11.22 – death 1738.11.12)
- Jan Kazimierz de Alten Bokum (1719.07.30 – 1721.06.30) while Bishop of Chełmno ([1718.06.27] 1719.07.30 – 1721.06.30); previously Bishop of Przemyśl (Poland) (1701.07.18 – 1719.07.30)
- Feliks Ignacy Kretowski (1723.08.30 – death 1730.12.06) while Bishop of Chełmno ([1722.11.20] 1723.08.30 – 1730.12.06)
- Andrzej Stanisław Załuski (?1723.11.22 – 1736.11.19) while Bishop of Płock (Poland) (1723.11.22 – 1736.11.19); later Bishop of Łuck (Poland) (1736.11.19 – 1739.07.20), Bishop of Chełmno ([1739.03.08] 1739.07.20 – 1746.05.02), Bishop of Kraków (Poland) ([1746.03.12] 1746.05.02 – death 1758.12.16)
- Tomasz Franciszek Czapski, O. Cist. (1730.12.06 – 1733.04.23) while Bishop of Chełmno; succeeded as former Titular Bishop of Diana (1726.07.01 – 1730.12.06) as Coadjutor Bishop of Chełmno (1726.07.01 – 1730.12.06)
- Adam Stanisław Grabowski (1736.09.26 – 1739.07.15) while Bishop of Chełmno; previously Titular Bishop of Nilopolis (1733.06.22 – 1736.09.26) as Auxiliary Bishop of Poznań (Poland) (1733.06.22 – 1736.09.26); later Bishop of Kujawy–Pomorze (Poland) (1739.07.15 – 1741.09.18), Bishop of Warmia (Poland) ([1741.04.14] 1741.09.18 – death 1766.12.15), Apostolic Administrator of Diocese of Sambia (Prussia) (1741.09.18 – 1766.12.15)
- Wojciech Stanisław Leski, O. Cist. (1747.04.10 – death 1758.09.19) while Bishop of Chełmno ([1746.10.17] 1747.04.10 – 1758.09.19)
- Andrzej Ignacy Baier (1759.02.12 – 1763) while Bishop of Chełmno ([1758.11.18] 1759.02.12 – death 1785.01.31).

=== Latin titular see ===
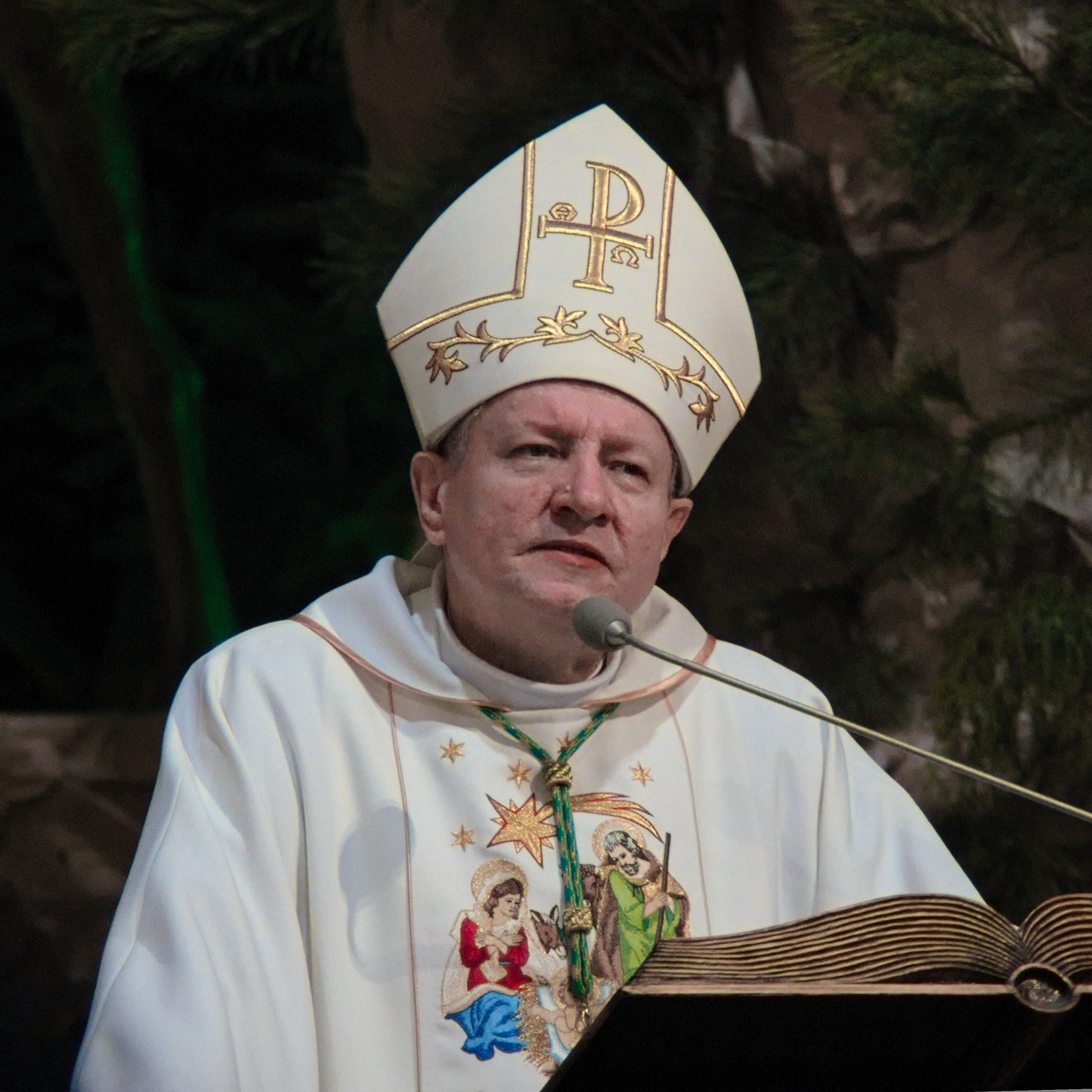
Adam Wodarczyk, titular Bishop of Pomesania since 2014

In October 2014 the Catholic diocese was nominally restored as Titular bishopric of Pomezania (Polish) / Pomesania (Curiate Italian) / Pomesanien (German) / Latin adjective Pomesanien(sis).

It has had the following incumbent(s), so far of the fitting Episcopal (lowest) rank :

- Adam Wodarczyk (2014.12.13 – ...), as Auxiliary Bishop of Archdiocese of Katowice (Poland) (2014.12.13 – ...).

== Lutheran bishopric ==
Beginning in 1523 during the Protestant Reformation, the diocese was effectively administered by Lutheran bishops. In 1587, the diocese was secularized by the regent of Ducal Prussia, George Frederick.

The Lutheran incumbents were :

- George of Polentz (from 1523 first Lutheran Bishop)
- Erhard of Queis (1523–1525)
- Paul Speratus (1530–1551)
- Georg von Venediger (1567–1574)
- Johannes Wigand (1575–1587)
