= Erhard of Queis =

- Church: Lutheran
- See: Marienwerder
- In office: 1523–1525

Personal details
- Born: c. 1490; Storkow, Brandenburg
- Died: 10 September 1529; Preußisch Holland

Erhard of Queis (c. 1490, in Storkow, Brandenburg – 10 September 1529, in Preußisch Holland) was Bishop of Pomesania. He is considered one of the pioneers of the Reformation in Prussia.

== Life ==
Details of Queis's youth are not available.

He enrolled at the university of Frankfurt (Oder) in 1506. In 1515, he went to Bologna to read law. It is not clear whether he acquired the degree of Doctor during either of these studies. By 1523, he was Chancellor of the Duchy of Legnica, serving Duke Frederick II. In this position, he met Grand Master Albert, who persuaded him to join the Teutonic Order and take over the vacant second Prussian Bishopric of Pomesania. Queis was elected bishop by the Pomesanian cathedral chapter of Marienwerder on 10 September 1523. His election was never confirmed by the Pope, since Queis professed to evangelic Lutheran Reformation. He took up residence in Riesenburg Castle anyway.

Grand Master Albert had great confidence in Queis' legal and administrative expertise. He sent Erhard to negotiations in Pressburg (Bratislava) and Kraków about the secularisation of the Teutonic State of Prussia on the Baltic coast. Queis paid homage to the King of Poland, as protector/patron on Albert's behalf. He carried out similar missions later. When he accompanied the Duke to Danzig in 1526, he was already wearing secular clothing.

Queis also travelled to Kiel, to conclude a marriage contract for Duke Albert, who coveted the hand of the Danish king's daughter Dorothea. This kind of diplomatic services for the young Duchy kept him from fulfilling his ecclesiastical duties for a long time. Queis sided wholly with the Reformation, just like his predecessor, bishop George of Polentz.

At the end of 1524, Queis published his reform program Themata episcopi Riesenburgensis. In this program he posits out that Christ instituted only two sacraments, and that laws of mortals in the Church should be abolished. He demanded that church services should be in German and forbade the worship of the Eucharist and the Corpus Christi procession. His 19th thesis was: "The daily Mass is an abomination to God: therefore it shall henceforth not be held in any church nor anywhere else". He allowed priest and members of religious orders to marry. The Duchy of Prussia adopted in 1525 a new Church Order written by the two bishops Polentz and Queis, who had turned Lutherans.

Queis and Polentz had ceded temporal power over their bishoprics to the Duke, and only retained the Lordships of Marienwerder und Schönberg. Queis married Duchess Apollonia, a daughter of Victor of Poděbrady, Duke of Münsterberg and Opava, who had been a nun in the Poor Clares monastery at Strzelin.

Erhard of Queis died in 1529, on his return from a convention of the Prussian Landtag in Königsberg. His widow died in 1534.

== References and sources ==
- Paul Tschackert: Urkundenbuch zur Reformationsgeschichte des Herzogthums Preußen, vol. 1, Leipzig, 1890, p. 39
- Robert Stupperich: Die Reformation im Ordensland Preußen, Ulm, 1966
- W. Hubatsch: Geschichte der evangelischen Kirche in Ostpreußen, vo1, Göttingen, 1968, passim

Erhard of Queis Born: circa 1490 Died: 10 September 1529
Titles in Lutheranism
Preceded by George of Polentz	Bishop of Pomesania; 1523-1525	Succeeded by Paul Speratus
