= Compromise of Thorn =

1521 Teutonic-Polish peace agreement

The Compromise of Thorn (also known as the Compromise of Toruń) on 5th of April, 1521, was a peace agreement between the Teutonic Order and the Kingdom of Poland. It was a direct response to the Polish–Teutonic War, a feud that had been going on between both countries for about two years.

== Background ==
Decades before the Compromise, the Kingdom of Poland and the Teutonic Order were engaged in The Thirteen Years' War, where the Polish king had sided with Prussian rebels in order to fight the Teutons. Following a Teutonic defeat, Casimir IV Jagiellon forced them to agree to the Second Peace of Thorn, which reduced the amount of power the Order had, as well as annexing almost all of western Prusal (Prussia). This also gave the Polish control of Malbork, the former capital of the Teutonic Order.

Fifty-three years later, and tensions were still high between the two eastern European powers. Around January 1519, Polish forces near Kolo attacked towards Eastern Prussia, and kick-started the Polish–Teutonic War. Both countries were near-equal in military power, causing the war to mostly be a standstill for its three-year duration.

Nearing the end of the war, current Holy Roman Emperor Charles V called for both countries to cease their fighting, as the Ottoman Empire had invaded Hungary at this point.

== Aftermath ==
Part of the Compromise required both countries to partake in a four-year truce, giving time for Holy Roman Emperor Charles V and Polish King Casimir IV Jagiellon to decide whether Albrecht, former and last leader of the Teutonic Knights, would have to do fealty and homage for Casimir. While no settlement was reached for the latter during that time, Albrecht continued to reach out for allies, most notably Martin Luther, who told Albrecht to abandon his Catholic ways and convert Prussia into a duchy. He agreed, converted to Lutheranism, and dropped out of most positions he was in that related to Catholicism. The old Teutonic Order lost the majority of their power in the region, and eventually Albrecht would become the duke of the Duchy of Prussia.

== See also ==
- Peace of Thorn (1411)
- Second Peace of Thorn (1466)
