= Schaaken Castle =

Ruined castle in Russia

Coordinates: 54°54′21″N 20°40′8″E

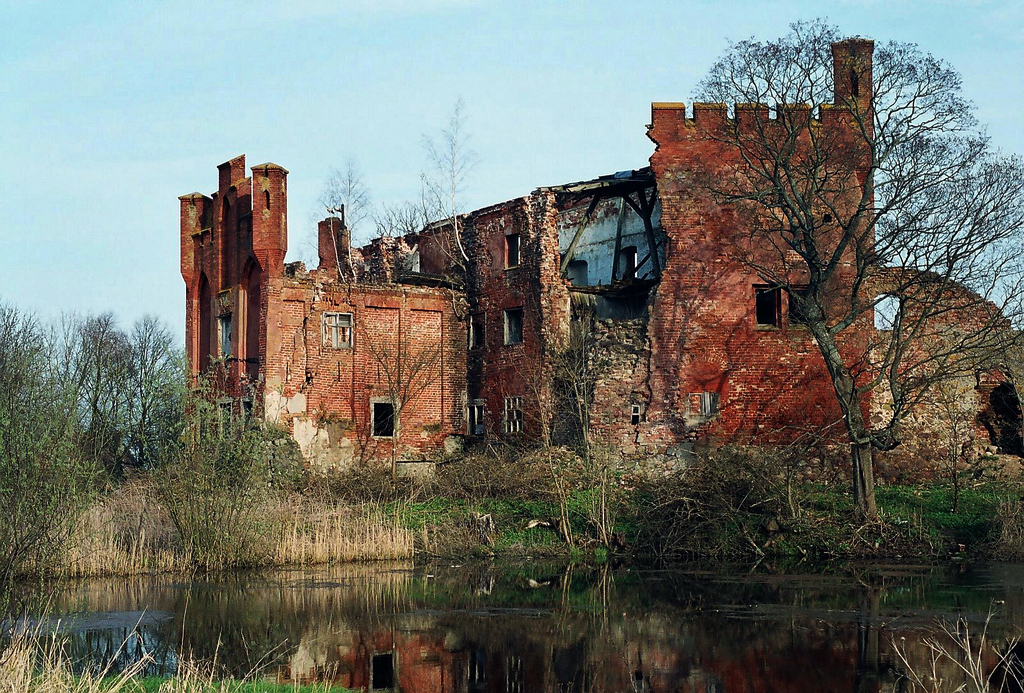
Ruins of Schaaken Castle

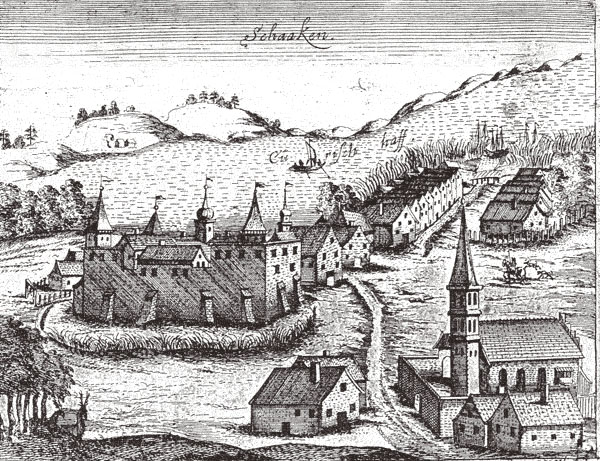
1576 engraving of Castle Schaaken by Caspar Hennenberger

Schaaken Castle is a ruined castle originally built for the Teutonic Knights, in Nekrasovo, Kaliningrad Oblast, Russia (until 1945 Liska-Schaaken in East Prussia). It was extensively altered in the 19th century and has become a ruin since World War II.

The first mention of a fortress on the site is in the Chronicle of the Teutonic Knights in 1258. The order established its first castle there in approximately 1270, on the site of an ancient Prussian fortification and trading place called Shoken (grass or grassland in Old Prussian). The walled enclosure was octagonal, following the outline of the original earthen fort, and had outer baileys at two points. The castle belonged to the Bishop of Samland. The original building was wooden; beginning in 1328 it was rebuilt in stone. In 1525, when the holdings of the Teutonic Order were secularised, it became a ducal seat. It was destroyed by fire in 1606 and partially rebuilt.

Peter the Great stayed at Schaaken Castle three times; it was Alexander Suvorov's headquarters during the Seven Years' War. In the first third of the 19th century the residential building of the castle was remodeled in a Romantic Gothic style, with a new roof and slender corner towers. The kitchen building, the underground vaults, and the stone ring wall remained largely unchanged.

At the time of World War II, the castle and 600 hectares (1,500 acres) of land was a family farm; the Red Army took it in January 1945, and the farm subsequently became a kolkhoz. The castle also served for a while as a children's home.

Since 1975 the castle has become a ruin. A German and a Russian association formed to stabilise and rebuild it, and proposed using it for a purpose such as a German-Russian friendship centre or a museum of 13th-century architecture. Yuri Sabuga, a Kaliningrad architect, examined the site in 2002 and said that the castle could be salvaged. Some repairs were later done and a small museum of medieval exhibits and a horse ring were established there. In March 2012 a fire at the castle damaged the museum.
