= Treaty of Kraków =

1525 treaty between Poland and the Teutonic Knights

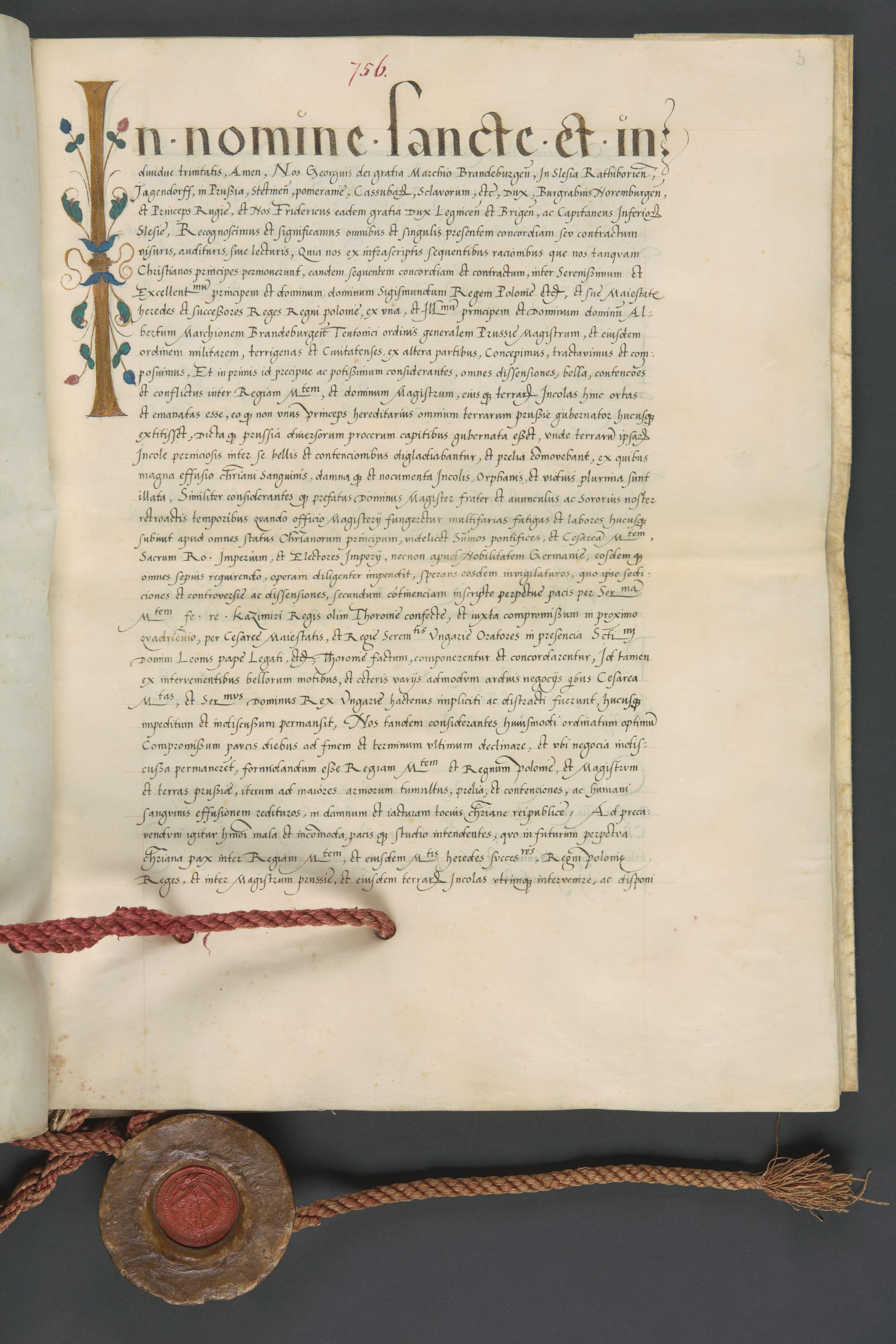
Treaty of Kraków

The Treaty of Kraków was signed on 8 April 1525 between the Kingdom of Poland and the Grand Master of the Teutonic Knights. It officially ended the Polish–Teutonic War (1519-1521)

The treaty gave Grand Master Albert of Hohenzollern / Duke of Prussia (1490-1568, reigned 1525-1568), of the Royal dynasty of the House of Hohenzollern enough autonomy to resign as grand master and secede from the Order to become Duke of the new Duchy of Prussia created by secularization of the Monastic state of the Teutonic Knights. This was sealed by the Prussian Homage of 10 April. 1525
