= Roman Catholic Diocese of Tuscanella =

Former Latin Catholic ecclesiastical jurisdiction in Italy

The Diocese of Tuscanella (Latin: Tuscaniensis) was a Latin Church residential bishopric of the Catholic Church, in existence by the 7th century. Even at the time of the Lombard invasions, it belonged to the Duchy of Rome and was immediately subject to the Pope. The seat of the bishop was originally in the church of S. Maria, then in the church of S. Pietro, and after 1592 in the church of S. Giacomo.

On 22 February 852 Pope Leo IV, in the bull Convenit apostolico, addressed to Bishop Virbono, confirmed the jurisdiction of the bishop over the churches and possessions of his diocese. This document is revealing, because it not only describes the towns and parishes dependent on the bishop (including Montalto, Tarquinia and Viterbo), but also details the boundaries of the diocese.

From 1192 the diocese of Tuscanella and the diocese of Viterbo were in personal union (aeque principaliter).

The diocese was suppressed in 1986.

The name, though not the diocesan structure, was revived as the Latin Catholic titular see of Tuscania in 1991.

== Bishops ==
...

- Virbonus (attested 595)

...

- Maurus (attested 649)

...

- Vitalianus (attested 680)

...
Leo (attested 767)

- Aurianus (attested 769)

...

- Godemundus (attested 826)

...

- Virbonus (attested 850)
- Joannes (attested 853, 861)
- Petrus (attested 863)
- Gualbertus (attested 875)
- Joannes (attested 876)
- Joannes (attested 896, 901)

...

- Humbertus (attested 998)

...

- Joannes (attested 1027)
- Bonizo (attested 1037, 1044)
- Joannes (c. 1048)
- Benedictus (attested 1048, 1049)
- Bonizo (attested 1050)
- Gisilbertus (attested 1059, 1080)

...

- Riccardus (attested 1086, 1093)

...

- Guido (attested 1111, 1112)
- Petrus (attested 1126, 1128)
- Nicolaus (attested c. 1140)
- Ludovicus (attested 1142)
- Rodolfus (attested 1143)
- Censius (attested 1149–1179)
- Gottifredus (attested 1184–1188)
- Joannes (1188–1192)

== See also ==
- Diocese of Viterbo e Tuscania

== Bibliography ==
- Campanari, Secondiano (1856). Tuscania e i suoi monumenti (in Italian). Vol. I. Montefiascone: Tip. del Seminario.
- Campanari, Secondiano (1856). Tuscania e i suoi monumenti (in Italian). Vol. II. Documenti istorici. Montefiascone: Tip. del Seminario. [annotated list of bishops, pp. 15–77]
- Cappelletti, Giuseppe (1847). Le chiese d'Italia (in Italian). Vol. sesto (6). Venice: G. Antonelli. pp. 76–97.
- Gams, Pius Bonifatius (1873). Series episcoporum Ecclesiae catholicae: quotquot innotuerunt a beato Petro apostolo (in Latin). Ratisbon: Typis et Sumptibus Georgii Josephi Manz., pp. 76–77.
- Kehr, Paul Fridolin (1907). Italia pontificia (in Latin). Vol. II. Latium. Berlin: Apud Weidmannos. pp. 196–203.
- Lanzoni, Francesco (1927). Le diocesi d'Italia dalle origini al principio del secolo VII (an. 604). Faenza: F. Lega, p. 527. (in Italian)
- Schwartz, Gerhard (1907). Die Besetzung der Bistümer Reichsitaliens unter den sächsischen und salischen Kaisern: mit den Listen der Bischöfe, 951-1122. Leipzig: B.G. Teubner. pp. 265–267. (in German)
- Signorelli, Giuseppe (1907). Viterbo nella storia della Chiesa (in Italian). Viterbo: Tipografia Cionfi.
- Ughelli, Ferdinando; Coleti, Niccolo (1722). Italia sacra (in Latin). Vol. Tomus decimus. Venice: Apud Sebastianum Coleti. pp. 179–181.
