= George of Polentz =

- Church: Lutheran
- See: Samland
- In office: 1518–1550
- Predecessor: Günther von Bünau
- Successor: Joachim Mörlin

Personal details
- Born: c. 1478
- Died: 1550; Balga

George of Polentz (born: c. 1478; died: 1550 in Balga) was bishop of Samland and Pomesania and a lawyer. He was the first Lutheran bishop and also a Protestant reformer.

Polentz was a member of an old Saxon noble family. He studied law in Bologna and was private secretary to the papal Curia, then stood as a soldier in the service of Emperor Maximilian I. Under Margrave Albert of Brandenburg-Ansbach, the Grand Master of the Teutonic Order, he came to Königsberg. Polentz was confirmed as Bishop of Samland by the Curia in 1519.

Johann Briesmann taught him Hebrew and the teachings of Martin Luther. Polentz was regent of Prussia during the absence of Duke Albert from 1522 to 1525. He worked together with the lawyer Erhard of Queis, the Bishop of Pomesania. Already in 1523 Polentz converted to Lutheranism. He gave his first Lutheran sermon at Christmas 1523 in Königsberg.

Already on 18 January 1524 Polentz ordered to only use native languages at baptisms. He forbade the widespread pagan worship of Perkūnas, symbolised by the goat buck, in the same year, repeated in 1540. When Albert gave his approval, bishop Polentz launched the Reformation in Prussia. After Albrecht 1525 transformed the Teutonic State of Prussia into the secular Duchy of Prussia, Polentz invited a large number of Protestant clergy into the country, such as the reformer Ambrosius Feierabend, who had been exiled from Elbing in 1539. The Prussian estates established the Lutheran Church in Prussia by the Church Order decided on 10 December 1525.

Polentz implemented the Prussian Church Order. The Church Order provided for visitations of the parishioners and pastors, first carried out by Polentz in 1538. Georg of Polentz married in 1525 and after the death of this first wife, again in 1527.

== Notes ==
George of Polentz Born: c. 1478 Died: 1550
Religious titles
Preceded by Günther von Bünau	Bishop of Samland; 1518-1550	Succeeded by Joachim Mörlin
Catholic Church titles
Preceded by Hiob von Dobeneck	Bishop of Pomesania; 1521-1523	Succeeded by Erhard of Queis
