= Duchy of Prussia =

Historical state (1525–1701)

Duchy of Prussia Herzogtum Preußen (German) Prusy Książęce (Polish) Prūsijos kunigaikštystė (Lithuanian)
- 1525–1701
- Flag (1525–1657) Coat of arms

- The Duchy of Prussia (yellow)
- Status: Fief of Poland (until 1657); Part of Brandenburg–Prussia (from 1618)
- Capital: Königsberg; 54°50′N 21°20′E
- Common languages: Low German, German, Polish, Lithuanian, Old Prussian
- Religion: Lutheranism
- Demonym: Prussian
- Government: Feudal monarchy
- Duke
  - 1525–1568: Albert
  - 1568–1618: Albert Frederick
  - 1618–1619: John Sigismund
  - 1619–1640: George William
  - 1640–1688: Frederick William
  - 1688–1701: Frederick
- Legislature: Estates
- Historical era: Early modern period
  - Prussian Homage: 10 April 1525
  - Treaty of Wehlau: 1657
  - Coronation: 1701

Area
  - Total: 30,000 km^{2} (12,000 sq mi)
- Currency: Thaler
Preceded by	Succeeded by
State of the Teutonic Order	Brandenburg–Prussia
- Today part of: Lithuania; Poland; Russia

The Duchy of Prussia (German: Herzogtum Preußen, Polish: Księstwo Pruskie, Lithuanian: Prūsijos kunigaikštystė) or Ducal Prussia (German: Herzogliches Preußen; Polish: Prusy Książęce) was a duchy in the region of Prussia established as a result of secularization of the Monastic Prussia, the territory that remained under the control of the State of the Teutonic Order until the Protestant Reformation in 1525.

== Overview ==
The duchy became the first Protestant state when Albert, Duke of Prussia formally adopted Lutheranism in 1525. It was inhabited by German, Polish (mainly in Masuria), and Lithuanian-speaking (mainly in Lithuania Minor) populations.

In 1525, during the Protestant Reformation, in accordance to the Treaty of Kraków, the Grand Master of the Teutonic Knights, Albert, secularized the order's prevailing Prussian territory (the Monastic Prussia), becoming Albert, Duke of Prussia. As the State of the Teutonic Order had been a hereditary fief of the Polish Crown since the end of the Thirteen Years' War (1454–1466), King of Poland Sigismund I the Old, as its suzerain, granted the territory as a fief to Duke Albert per the Treaty of Kraków, a decision that was sealed by the Prussian Homage in Kraków in April 1525. The new duke established Lutheranism as the first Protestant state church. The capital remained in Königsberg (present-day Kaliningrad).

The duchy was inherited by the Hohenzollern prince-electors of Brandenburg in 1618. This personal union is referred to as Brandenburg-Prussia. Frederick William, the "Great Elector" of Brandenburg, achieved full sovereignty over the duchy under the 1657 Treaty of Wehlau, confirmed in the 1660 Treaty of Oliva. In the following years, attempts were made to return to Polish suzerainty, especially by the capital city of Königsberg, whose burghers rejected the treaties and viewed the region as part of Poland. The Duchy of Prussia was elevated to a kingdom in 1701.

== History ==
=== Background ===
As Protestantism spread among the laity of the Teutonic Monastic State of Prussia, dissent began to develop against the Roman Catholic rule of the Teutonic Knights, whose Grand Master, Albert, Duke of Prussia, a member of a cadet branch of the House of Hohenzollern, lacked the military resources to assert the order's authority.

After losing a war against the Kingdom of Poland, and with his personal bishop, Georg von Polenz of Pomesania and of Samland, who had converted to Lutheranism in 1523, and a number of his commanders already supporting Protestant ideas, Albert began to consider a radical solution.

At Wittenberg in 1522, and at Nuremberg in 1524, Martin Luther encouraged him to convert the order's territory into a secular principality under his personal rule, as the Teutonic Knights would not be able to survive the Reformation.

=== Establishment ===
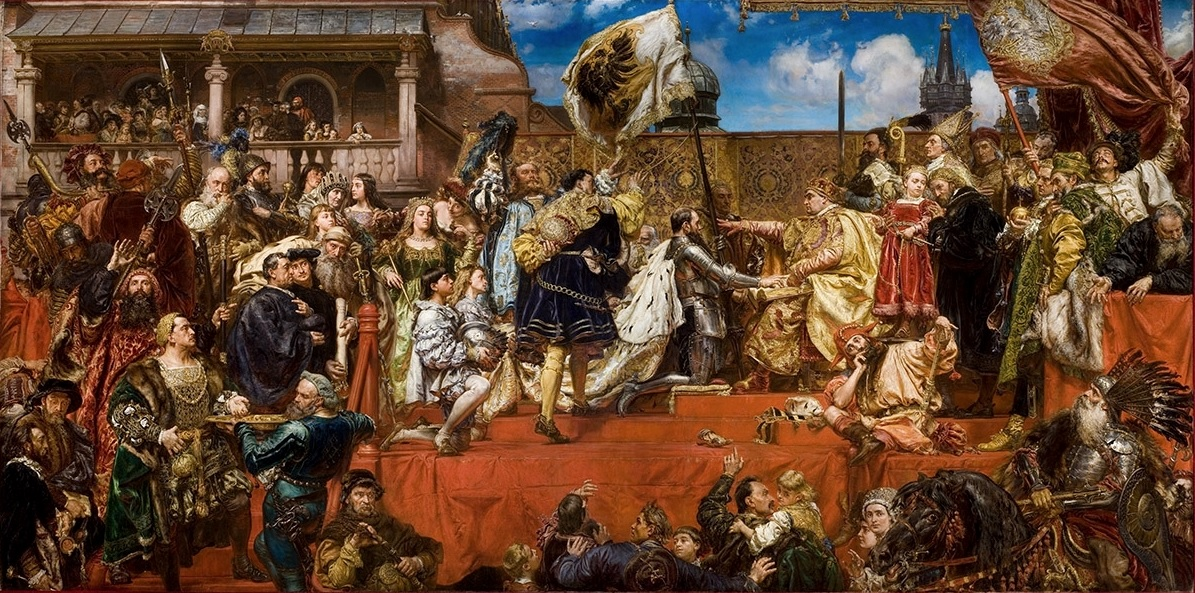
The Prussian Homage (by Jan Matejko, 1882, National Museum, Kraków): Albert receives Ducal Prussia as a fief from King Sigismund I of Poland in 1525.

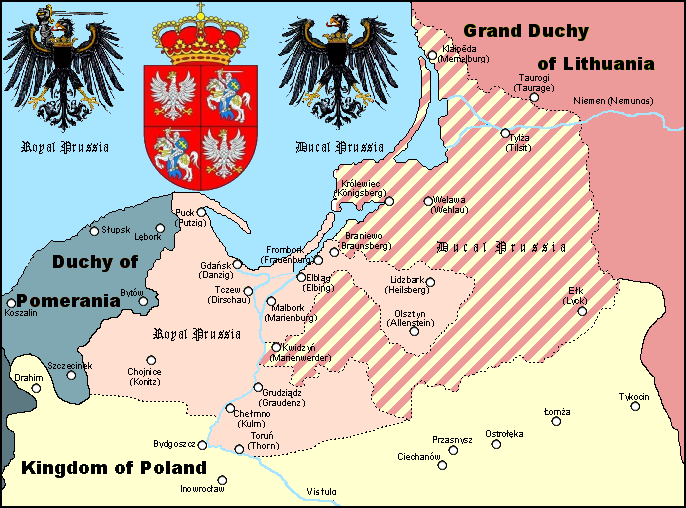
Ducal Prussia as a fief of the Polish Crown (striped) in the second half of the 16th century

On 10 April 1525, Albert resigned his position, became a Protestant and in the Prussian Homage was granted the title "Duke of Prussia" by his uncle, King Sigismund I of Poland. In a deal partly brokered by Luther, Ducal Prussia became the first Protestant state, anticipating the dispensations of the Peace of Augsburg of 1555.

When Albert returned to Königsberg, he publicly declared his conversion and announced to a quorum of Teutonic Knights his new ducal status. The knights who disapproved of the decision were pressured into acceptance by Albert's supporters and the burghers of Königsberg, and only Eric of Brunswick-Wolfenbüttel, Komtur of Memel, opposed the new duke. On 10 December 1525, at their session in Königsberg, the Prussian estates established the Lutheran Church in Ducal Prussia by deciding the Church Order.

By the end of Albert's rule, the offices of Grand Commander and Marshal of the Order had deliberately been left vacant, and the order was left with but 55 knights in Prussia. Some of the knights converted to Lutheranism in order to retain their property and then married into the Prussian nobility, while others returned to the Holy Roman Empire, and remained Catholic. These remaining Teutonic Knights, led by the next Grand Master, Walter von Cronberg, continued to unsuccessfully claim Prussia, but retained much of the estates in the Teutonic bailiwicks outside of Prussia.

On 1 March 1526, Albert married Princess Dorothea, daughter of King Frederick I of Denmark, thereby establishing political ties between Lutheranism and Scandinavia. Albert was greatly aided by his elder brother George, Margrave of Brandenburg-Ansbach, who had earlier established the Protestant religion in his territories of Franconia and Upper Silesia. Albert also found himself reliant on support from his uncle Sigismund I of Poland, as the Holy Roman Empire, and the Roman Catholic Church, had banned him for his Protestantism.

The Teutonic Order had only superficially carried out its mission to Christianize the native rural population and erected few churches within the state's territory. There was little longing for Roman Catholicism. Baltic Old Prussians and Prussian Lithuanian peasants continued to practice pagan customs in some areas, for example, adhering to beliefs in Perkūnas (Perkunos), symbolized by the goat buck, Potrimpo, and Pikullos (Patollu) while "consuming the roasted flesh of a goat". Bishop George of Polentz had forbidden the widespread forms of pagan worship in 1524 and repeated the ban in 1540.

On 18 January 1524, Bishop George had ordered the use of native languages at baptisms, which improved the acceptance of baptism by the peasants. There was little active resistance to the new Protestant religion. The Teutonic Knights, having brought Catholicism, made the transition to Protestantism easier.

The Church Order of 1525 provided for visitations of the parishioners and pastors, which were first carried out by Bishop George in 1538. Because Ducal Prussia was ostensibly a Lutheran land, authorities travelled throughout the duchy ensuring that Lutheran teachings were being followed and imposing penalties on pagans and dissidents. The rural population of native descent was thoroughly Christianised only starting with the Reformation in Prussia.

A peasant rebellion broke out in Sambia in 1525. The combination of taxation by the nobility, the contentions of the Protestant Reformation, and the abrupt secularisation of the Teutonic Order's remaining Prussian lands exacerbated peasant unrest. The relatively well-to-do rebel leaders, including a miller from Kaimen and an innkeeper from Schaaken in Prussia, were supported by sympathisers in Königsberg. The rebels demanded the elimination of newer taxes by the nobility, and a return to an older tax of two marks per hide (a measure of land of approximately forty acres).

They claimed to be rebelling against the harsh nobility, not against Duke Albert, who was away in the Holy Roman Empire and said that they would swear allegiance to him only in person. Upon Albert's return from the Empire, he called for a meeting of the peasants in a field, whereupon he surrounded them with loyal troops and had them arrested without incident. The leaders of the rebellion were subsequently executed. There were no more large-scale rebellions. Ducal Prussia became known as a land of Protestantism and sectarianism.

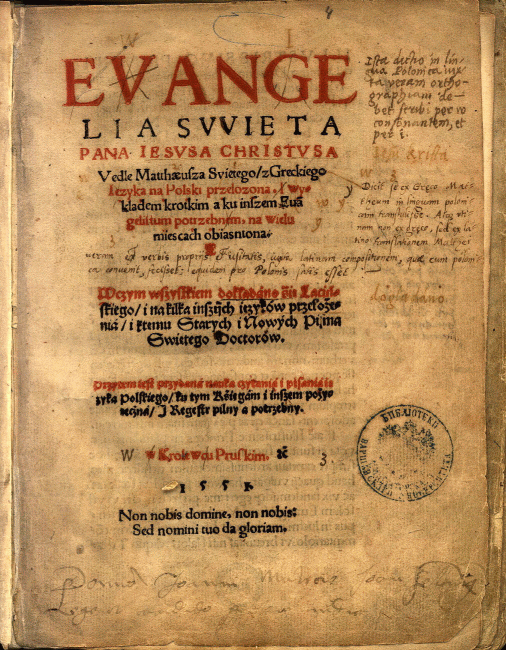
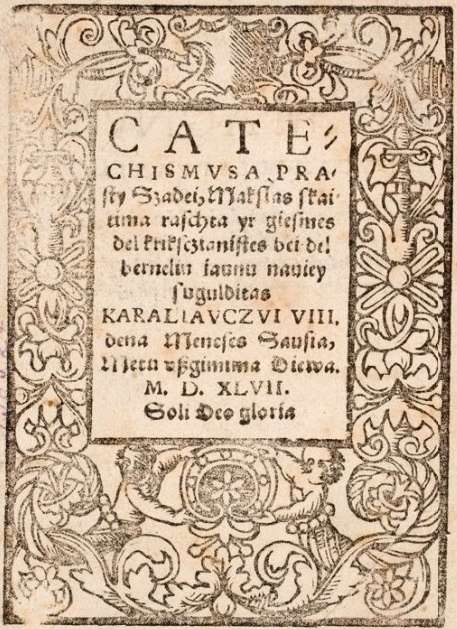
The duchy became a leading Polish and Lithuanian Lutheran and printing centre. In the mid-16th century, in Königsberg were published the first translation of the New Testament into Polish by Stanisław Murzynowski and the Catechism of Martynas Mažvydas, which is the first printed book in the Lithuanian language.

In 1544, Duke Albert founded the Albertina University in Königsberg, which became the principal educational establishment for Lutheran pastors and theologians of Prussia. In 1560, the university received a royal privilege from King Sigismund II Augustus of Poland. It was granted the same rights and autonomy that were enjoyed by the Kraków University and so it became one of the leading universities in the Polish–Lithuanian Commonwealth. The use of the native languages in church services made Duke Albert appoint exiled Protestant Lithuanian pastors as professors, e.g., Stanislovas Rapolionis and Abraomas Kulvietis, making the Albertina also a centre of Lithuanian language and literature.

While the composition of the nobility changed little in the transition from the monastic state to the duchy, the control of the nobility over the dependent peasantry increased. Prussia's free peasants, called Kölmer, were holders of free estates according to Culm law. Kölmer held them with about a sixth of the arable land, much more than in other nations in the feudal era.

Administratively, little changed in the transition from the Teutonic Knights to ducal rule. Although he was formally a vassal of the crown of Poland, Albert retained self-government for Prussia, his own army, the minting of his currency, a provincial assembly, (de, Landtag), and substantial autonomy in foreign affairs.

=== Lack of heirs ===
When Albert died in 1568, his teenage son (the exact age is unknown) Albert Frederick inherited the duchy. Sigismund II was also Albert Frederick's cousin. The Elector of Brandenburg Joachim II, converted to Lutheranism in 1539. Joachim wanted to merge his lands with the Prussian dukedom so that his heirs would inherit both. Joachim petitioned his brother-in-law, King Sigismund II of Poland, for the co-enfeoffment of his line of the Hohenzollern with the Prussian dukedom, and finally succeeded, including the then usual expenses.

On 19 July 1569, when, in Lublin, Poland, Duke Albert Frederick rendered King Sigismund II homage and was in return installed as Duke of Prussia in Lublin, the King simultaneously enfeoffed Joachim II and his descendants as co-heirs.

Administration in the duchy declined as Albert Frederick became increasingly feeble-minded, which led Margrave George Frederick of Brandenburg-Ansbach to become Regent of Prussia in 1577.

Following King Sigismund III's Prussian regency agreement (1605) with Joachim Frederick of Brandenburg and his Treaty of Warsaw, 1611, with John Sigismund of Brandenburg, confirming the Brandenburgian co-inheritance of Prussia, both regents guaranteed the free practice of Catholic religion in predominantly-Lutheran Prussia. Based on the agreements, some Lutheran churches were reconsecrated as Catholic places of worship (e.g. St. Nicholas Church, Elbląg in 1612).

=== Personal union with Brandenburg ===
In 1618, the Thirty Years' War broke out, and John Sigismund himself died the following year. His son, George William, was successfully invested with the duchy in 1623 by King of Poland Sigismund III Vasa, thus the personal union Brandenburg-Prussia was confirmed. Many of the Prussian Junkers were opposed to rule by the House of Hohenzollern of Berlin and appealed to Sigismund III Vasa for redress. Most of Prussian society sought to preserve the duchy's feudal ties with Poland as a safeguard against Hohenzollern absolutist rule, while relying on the Brandenburg electors to defend Prussian autonomy against any attempt by Poland to establish direct control. Only a small minority of nobles from the starosties of Neidenburg, Soldau, and Ortelsburg favored incorporation into Poland rather than maintaining the duchy's status as a fief.

During the Polish–Swedish wars, the duchy became administered in 1635 by the Polish statesman Jerzy Ossoliński, who was appointed by Polish King Władysław IV Vasa.

Frederick William, the "Great Elector", duke of Prussia and prince-elector of Brandenburg, wished to acquire Royal Prussia in order to territorially connect his two fiefs. Yet, during the Second Northern War, Charles X Gustav of Sweden invaded Ducal Prussia and dictated the Treaty of Königsberg (January 1656), which made the duchy a Swedish fief. In the Treaty of Marienburg (June 1656), Charles X Gustav promised to cede to Frederick William the Polish voivodships of Chełmno, Malbork, Pomerania, and the Prince-Bishopric of Warmia if Frederick William would support Charles Gustav's effort. The proposition was somewhat risky since Frederick William would definitely have to provide military support, and the reward could be provided only on victory. When the tide of the war turned against Charles X Gustav, he concluded the Treaty of Labiau (November 1656), making Frederick William I the full sovereign in Ducal Prussia and Warmia, which, however, was part of Poland.

=== Emancipation ===
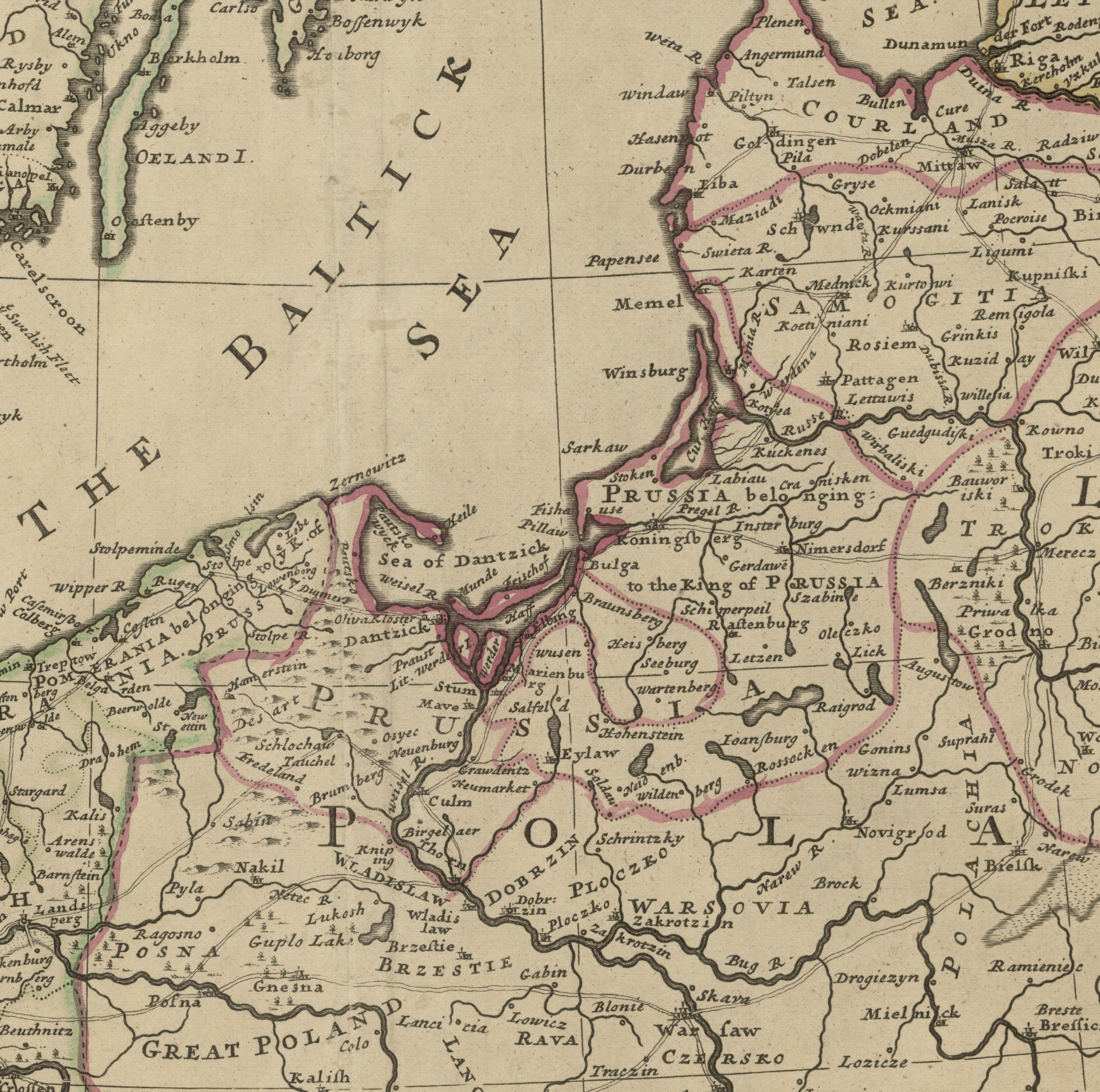
Prussia region with Dutchy of Prussia indicated already as "belonging to the «King of Prussia»" after self-crowning of Frederick I in 1701, map by Herman Moll.

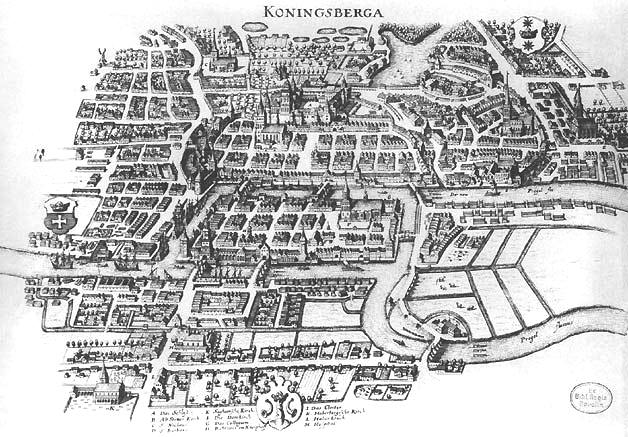
17th century view of Königsberg

In response to the Swedish-Prussian alliance, King John II Casimir Vasa submitted a counteroffer, which Frederick William accepted. They signed the Treaty of Wehlau on 19 September 1657 and the Treaty of Bromberg on 6 November 1657. In return for Frederick William's renunciation of the Swedish-Prussian alliance, John Casimir recognised Frederick William's full sovereignty over the Duchy of Prussia. After almost 200 years of Polish suzerainty over the Teutonic monastic state of Prussia and its successor Ducal Prussia, the territory passed under the full sovereignty of Brandenburg. Therefore, Duchy of Prussia then became the more adequate appellation for the state. Full sovereignty was a necessary prerequisite to upgrade Ducal Prussia to the sovereign Kingdom of Prussia in 1701 when Elector Frederick III of Brandenburg became "King in Prussia" in 1701.

However, the end of Polish suzerainty was met with resistance of the population, regardless of ethnicity, as it was afraid of Brandenburg absolutism and wished to remain part of the Polish Crown. The burghers of the capital city of Königsberg, led by Hieronymus Roth, rejected the treaties of Wehlau and Oliva and viewed Prussia as "indisputably contained within the territory of the Polish Crown". It was noted that the incorporation into the Polish Crown under the Treaty of Kraków was approved by the city of Königsberg, while the separation from Poland took place without the city's consent. Polish King John II Casimir was asked for help, and masses were held in Protestant churches for the king and the Polish Kingdom. But in 1662, Elector Frederick William entered the city with his troops and forced the city to swear allegiance to him.

However, in the following decades, at least one attempt to return to Polish suzerainty was made. In 1675, the Polish-French Treaty of Jaworów was signed according to which France was to support Polish efforts to regain control of the region, and Poland was to join the ongoing Franco-Brandenburgian War on the French side, however, it was not implemented.

The nature of the de facto collectively ruled governance of Brandenburg-Prussia became more apparent through the titles of the higher ranks of the Prussian government, seated in Brandenburg's capital of Berlin after the return of the court from Königsberg, where they had sought refuge from the Thirty Years' War.

=== Later development ===
After the Kingdom of Prussia's annexation of the bulk of the province of Royal Prussia in the First Partition of Poland in 1772, former Ducal Prussia, including previously Polish-controlled Warmia within Royal Prussia, was reorganized into the Province of East Prussia, while Pomerelia and the Malbork Land became the Province of West Prussia, with the exceptions of the two principal cities of Gdańsk and Toruń, annexed into West Prussia only in 1793 after the Second Partition of Poland.

The Kingdom of Prussia, then consisting of East and West Prussia, being a sovereign state, and Brandenburg, being a fief within the Holy Roman Empire, were amalgamated de jure only after the latter's dissolution in 1806, though later became again partially distinct during the existence of the German Confederation (1815–1866).

== See also ==
- Lithuania Minor
- Province of Prussia
- Masuria
- East Prussia
