= Diocese of Samland =

Former Latin Catholic diocese in medieval Prussia

Diocese of Samland Dioecesis Sambiensis
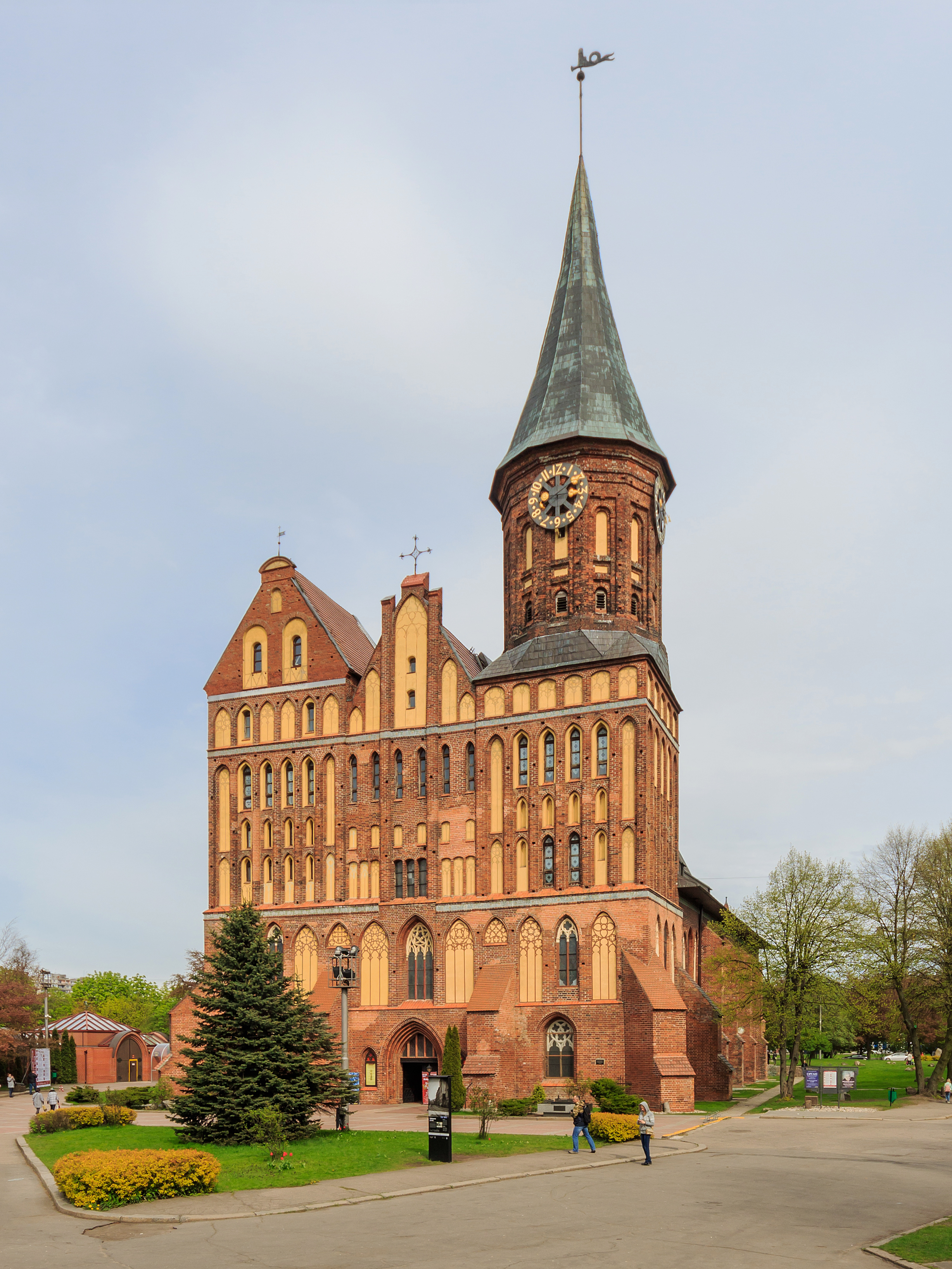
- Königsberg Cathedral

- Coat of arms

Location
- Ecclesiastical province: Riga

Information
- Denomination: Catholic Church
- Sui iuris church: Latin Church
- Rite: Roman Rite
- Established: 1243
- Cathedral: Königsberg Cathedral

The Diocese of Samland (Sambia) (German: Bistum Samland, Polish: Diecezja sambijska) was a Latin Catholic diocese of the Catholic Church in Samland (Sambia) in medieval Prussia. It was founded in 1243 by papal legate William of Modena. Its seat was Königsberg, until 1523 the episcopal residence was in Fischhausen. The bishopric became Lutheran in the 16th century during the Protestant Reformation and was eventually dissolved following the establishment of Ducal Prussia, a Protestant vassal duchy of the Kingdom of Poland.

The territory of the defunct bishopric of Samland came nominally under the jurisdiction of the Bishopric of Warmia in the 17th century, and the title of bishop of Samland was occasionally used by Warmian bishops. From 1617 to 1773, the Bishops of Warmia were the Catholic Apostolic administrators of Sambia. In 1821 Pope Pius VII formally dissolved the Diocese, and merged its territory with the Diocese of Warmia. Most of the area of the medieval bishopric of Sambia became a part of the Russian Kaliningrad Oblast in 1945 and is now under the jurisdiction of the Archdiocese of Moscow. A small section around the town of Gołdap became again a part of Poland and maintains its ties to the Archdiocese of Warmia, being administered by its suffragan Diocese of Ełk.

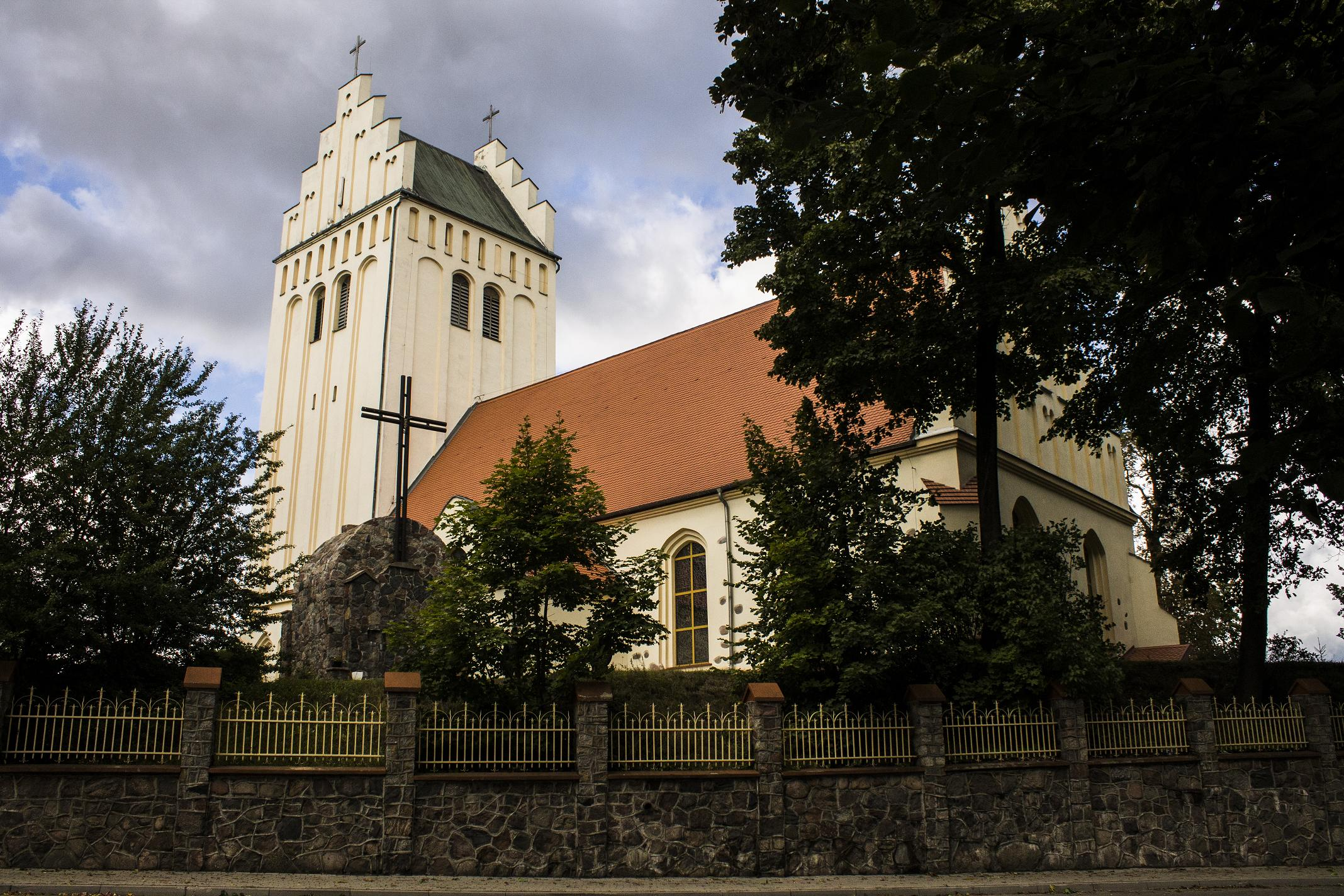
Mater Ecclesiae Co-Cathedral in Gołdap, current seat of the Sambian Co-Cathedral Chapter

Samland cathedral chapter was established in Königsberg in 1285 and was dissolved in the 16th century together with the bishopric. In 1989, it was re-established as the Sambian Collegiate Chapter (Sambian Co-Cathedral Chapter since 1992) in Gołdap.

== Bishops of Samland ==
- Dietrich I. 1252–1254
- Heinrich I. von Streitberg 1254–1274
- Hermann von Köln 1274–1276, † 1287
- Christian von Mühlhausen 1276–1295
- Siegfried von Regenstein 1295–1318
- Johann I. von Clare 1320–1344
- Jakob von Bludau 1344–1358
- (Jakob von Kulm 1344–1354)
- Bartholomäus von Radam 1354–1378
- Thilo von Marburg 1378–1386
- Heinrich II. Kuwal 1387–1395
- Heinrich III. von Seefeld 1395–1414
- Heinrich IV. von Schanenburg 1415–1416
- Johann II. von Saalfeld 1416–1425
- Michael Jung 1425–1442, † 1443
- Nikolaus I. Schlotterkopf 1442–1470
- Dietrich II. von Cuba 1470–1474
- Johann III. von Rehewinkel 1474–1497
- Nikolaus II. Krender 1497–1503
- Paul von Watt 1503–1505
- Günther von Bünau 1505–1518
- George of Polentz 1518–1550, turned it into a Lutheran bishopric
- Joachim Mörlin 1550–1571
- Tilemann Heshusius 1571–1577

== Catholic Apostolic Administrators ==
- Szymon Rudnicki 1617–1621
- John Albert Vasa 1621–1633
- Mikołaj Szyszkowski 1633–1643
- Jan Karol Konopacki 1643–1644
- Wacław Leszczyński 1644–1659
- Jan Stefan Wydżga 1659–1679
- Michał Stefan Radziejowski 1680–1688
- Jan Stanisław Zbąski 1688–1697
- Andrzej Chryzostom Załuski 1698–1711
- Teodor Andrzej Potocki 1711–1723
- Krzysztof Jan Szembek 1724–1740
- Adam Stanisław Grabowski 1741–1766
- Ignacy Krasicki 1767–1773
