= Johann Eustach von Westernach =

44th Grandmaster of the Teutonic Knights (1545–1627)

Hochmeister Johann Eustach von Westernach OT
- Grand Master of the Teutonic Order
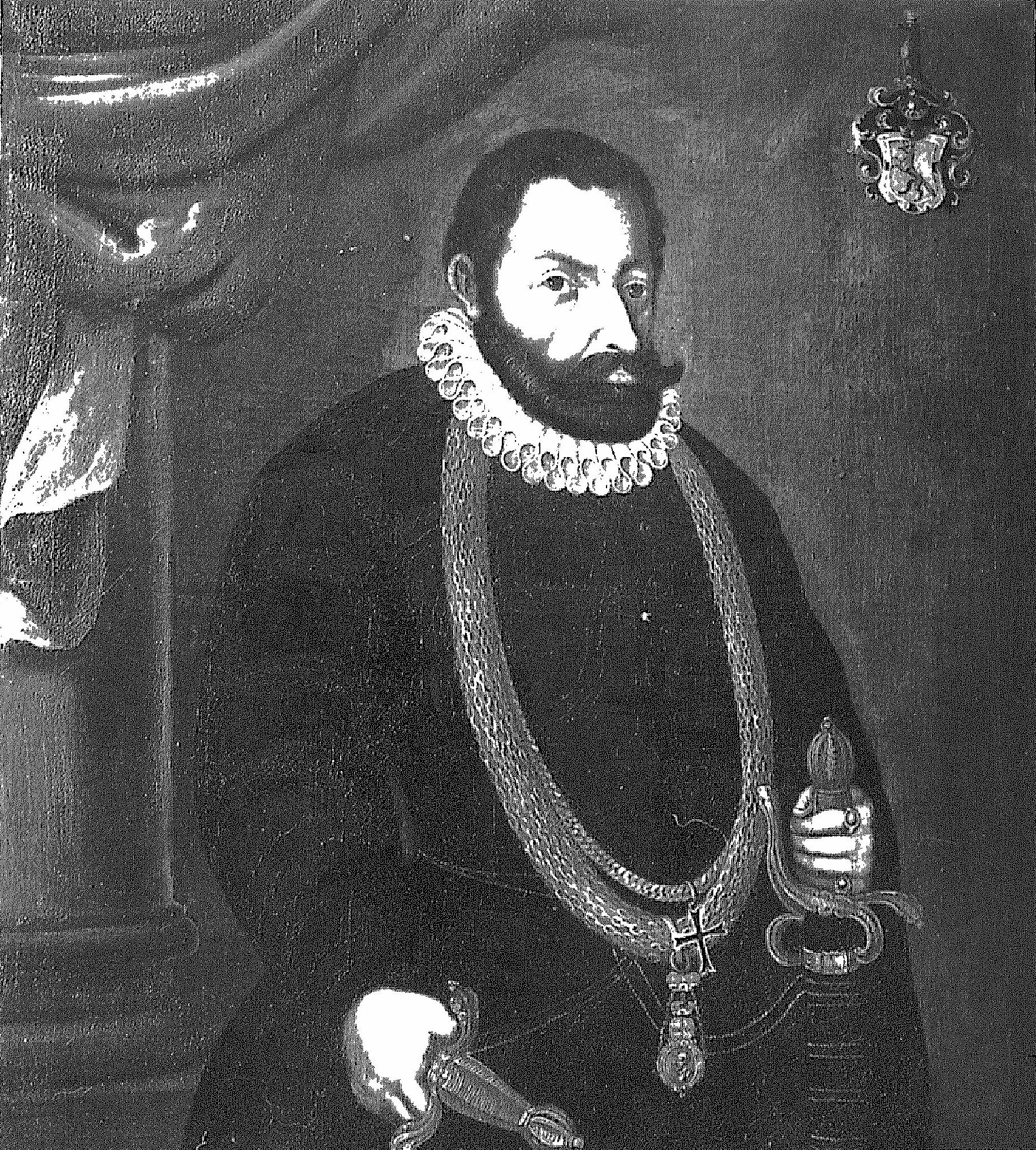
- 1596 painting of Johann Eustach
- Elected: March 19, 1625
- Term ended: October 25, 1627
- Predecessor: Charles of Austria, Bishop of Wroclaw
- Successor: Johann Kaspar von Stadion
- Previous posts: Küchenmeister at Ellingen (from 1567); Trappier at Frankfurt (from 1571); Hauskomtur (from 1580); Landkomtur of Bailiwick of Franconia (1585); Coadjutor (1612 - 1625)

Personal details
- Born: December 16, 1545
- Died: October 25, 1627 (aged 81) Mergentheim
- Buried: Deutschordenskirche, Mergentheim
- Denomination: Catholic
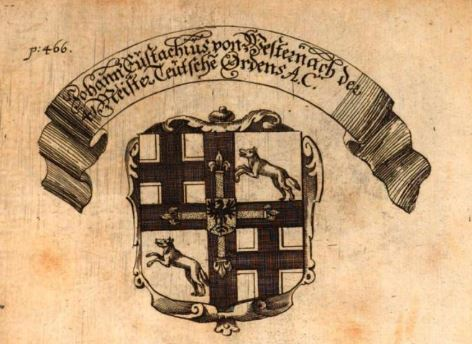
- Coat of arms

Johann Eustach von Westernach (December 16, 1545 – October 25, 1627) was the 44th Grandmaster of the Teutonic Order, reigning from 1625 to 1627.

== Biography ==
Johann Eustach came from a poor Swabian family of nobility, the House of Westernach. At a young age, he was orphaned by his father. His mother desired him to be a priest.

He first joined the Teutonic Order in 1566. He largely spent the next few decades working menial occupations within the order. In 1567, one year after joining the order, he became the Küchenmeister (kitchen master), for the local Komturs at the city of Ellingen. In 1571, he became trappier (or the individual responsible for the clothing supply) for the chamber komturs in Frankfurt. In 1580, he became hauskomtur (house commander) in Ellingen.

In 1585, he became the Landkomtur of the Bailiwick of Franconia. As the person in this position, he became the de facto coadjutor to the Austrian Archduke Maximilian III, who under the de jure Grandmaster Heinrich von Bobenhausen, had effectively seized control over the order, effectively deposing Heinrich. As coadjutor to Maximilian III, Johan Eustach accompanied Maximilian in his campaigns against the Polish-Lithuanian Commonwealth in the War of the Polish Succession. After Maximilian's defeat at Kraków and his surrender at Byczyna, he returned to Mergentheim. There, he aided Maximilian III in his efforts to halt Heinrich's attempt at ousting the Hapsburgs from power within the order. From 1593 to 1599, Johann accompanied Maximilian (who was now officially Grandmaster of the Teutonic Order) in Hapsburg Hungary and Croatia. Johann often served as envoy in secret missions from the imperial court.

In 1612, Johann was officially appointed as the coadjutor to Maximilian III. Despite this, when Maximilian passed in 1618, he declined to run for Grandmaster and instead favored Charles of Austria, Bishop of Wroclaw, to be Grandmaster. Upon Charles' election, Johann became his coadjutor.

=== Grandmaster of the Teutonic Order ===
Charles died on December 24, 1624. Johann Eustach initially proposed Archduke Leopold Wilhelm of Austria as Grandmaster; however, the young Archduke was under 11 years old at the time. With this, Johann was forced to accept his election as Grandmaster of the Teutonic Knights on March 19, 1625, becoming the temporary ruler of the order, effectively serving as regent for Leopold Wilhelm.

Johann's reign was marked mainly by issues stemming from the ongoing Thirty Years' War, not only as head of the Teutonic Order but also as head of the Westernach family, based in Swabia. Johann wished to retake Prussia from the Hohenzollerns, who, under former Grandmaster Albert, Duke of Prussia, had seized what was once the base of the Teutonic Order. The Holy Roman Emperor, Ferdinand II, pressured him into joining the pro-Imperial coalition in the Thirty Years' War, having sent Johann a letter promising him Teutonic control of Prussia. He also considered rebasing the order in Croatia or Hungary (where they were based in the early 13th century).

Johann perished suddenly on October 25, 1627. He was buried at the Deutschordenskirche in Mergentheim.

Grand Master of the Teutonic Order
| Preceded by Charles of Austria, Bishop of Wroclaw | Hochmeister; 1625-1627 | Succeeded by Johann Kaspar von Stadion |
