= Heinrich von Bobenhausen =

Grandmaster of the Teutonic Knights (c. 1514 – 1595)

Hochmeister Heinrich von Bobenhausen OT
- Grand Master of the Teutonic Order
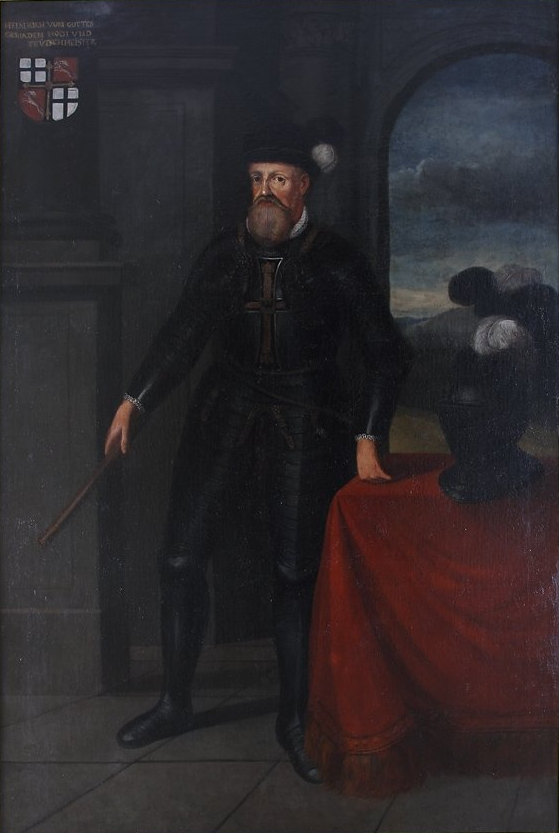
- 16th century portrait of Bobenhausen
- Elected: March 17, 1572
- Term ended: 1590
- Predecessor: Georg Hund von Wenkheim
- Successor: Maximilian III, Archduke of Austria
- Other posts: Komtur of Mergentheim (1547 - 1549); Komtur of Frankfurt (from 1549); Komtur of Regensburg (until 1565); Landkomtur of the Bailiwick of Franconia (from 1557); Komtur of Schloss Blumenthal; Administrator of the Princely Abbey of Fulda (1576 - 1586)

Personal details
- Born: c. 1514
- Died: March 21, 1595 (aged 80–81)
- Buried: Weissenburg Kommendenkirc
- Denomination: Roman Catholic
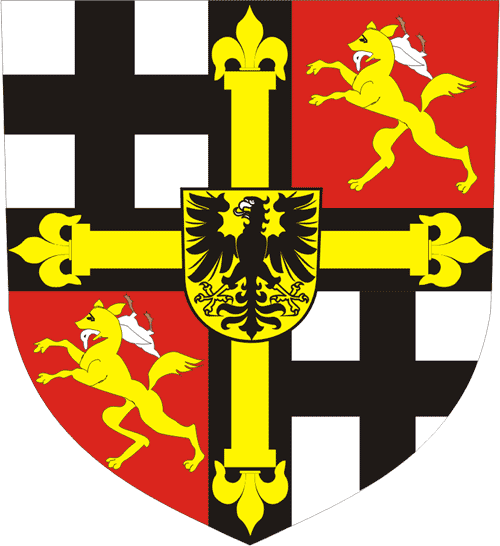
- Coat of arms

Heinrich von Bobenhausen (c. 1514 - March 21, 1595) was the 41st Grandmaster of the Teutonic Knights, reigning for close to two decades from 1572 to 1590.

== Biography ==
Heinrich descended from the Franconian von Bobenhausen noble family. He joined the Teutonic Order in 1547. He was Komtur of Mergentheim from 1547 to 1549, Komtur of Frankfurt from 1549, and Landkomtur of the Bailiwick of Franconia from 1557. He was also Komtur of Regensburg until 1565, when then-Grandmaster Wolfgang Schutzbar revoked his position. In 1566, when Schutzbar died, his successor, Georg Hund von Wenkheim, recalled Heinrich and made him Komtur of Schloss Blumenthal.

After Georg Hund's death in 1572, Heinrich was elected Grandmaster of the Teutonic Knights on March 17. In 1576, Holy Roman Emperor Maximilian II appointed him as administrator of the Princely Abbey of Fulda.

Unlike his predecessor, he was much more lenient towards Protestants and less supportive of the Counter-Reformation, which damaged relations between him and Maximilian II. Relations only worsened with Maximilian's successor, Rudolf II, who in 1585 forced Heinrich to share the title of Grandmaster. Rudolf's brother Maximilian III, seized control of the Order from Heinrich. After Maximilian took the oath on October 20, 1585, Heinrich was forced to surrender the Mergentheim Palace, the residence of the Teutonic Grandmaster since 1527.The following year in 1586, Heinrich was forced to surrender the Teutonic coat of arms, regalia, and the titles of Hochmeister and Deutschmeister. On February 20, he was forced to give up the administration of the Imperial Abbey of Fulda to Maximilian. Heinrich attempted to retake control of the order, however, the governor of Mergentheim halted his efforts in 1587.

In 1585, shortly after the Hapsburgs began to seize power over the order, Heinrich retired to the Deutschmeister's chamber house in Weissenburg, Alsace. In 1590, having already de facto lost all power over the Teutonic Order, Heinrich officially relinquished his position of Grandmaster. He died in Weissenberg on March 21, 1595, and was buried in the local Kommendenkirch ("Commandery Church").

Grand Master of the Teutonic Order
Preceded by Georg Hund von Wenkheim	Hochmeister; 1572-1590	Succeeded by Maximilian III, Archduke of Austria
