= Luther von Braunschweig =

Grand Master of the Teutonic Order from 1331 to 1335

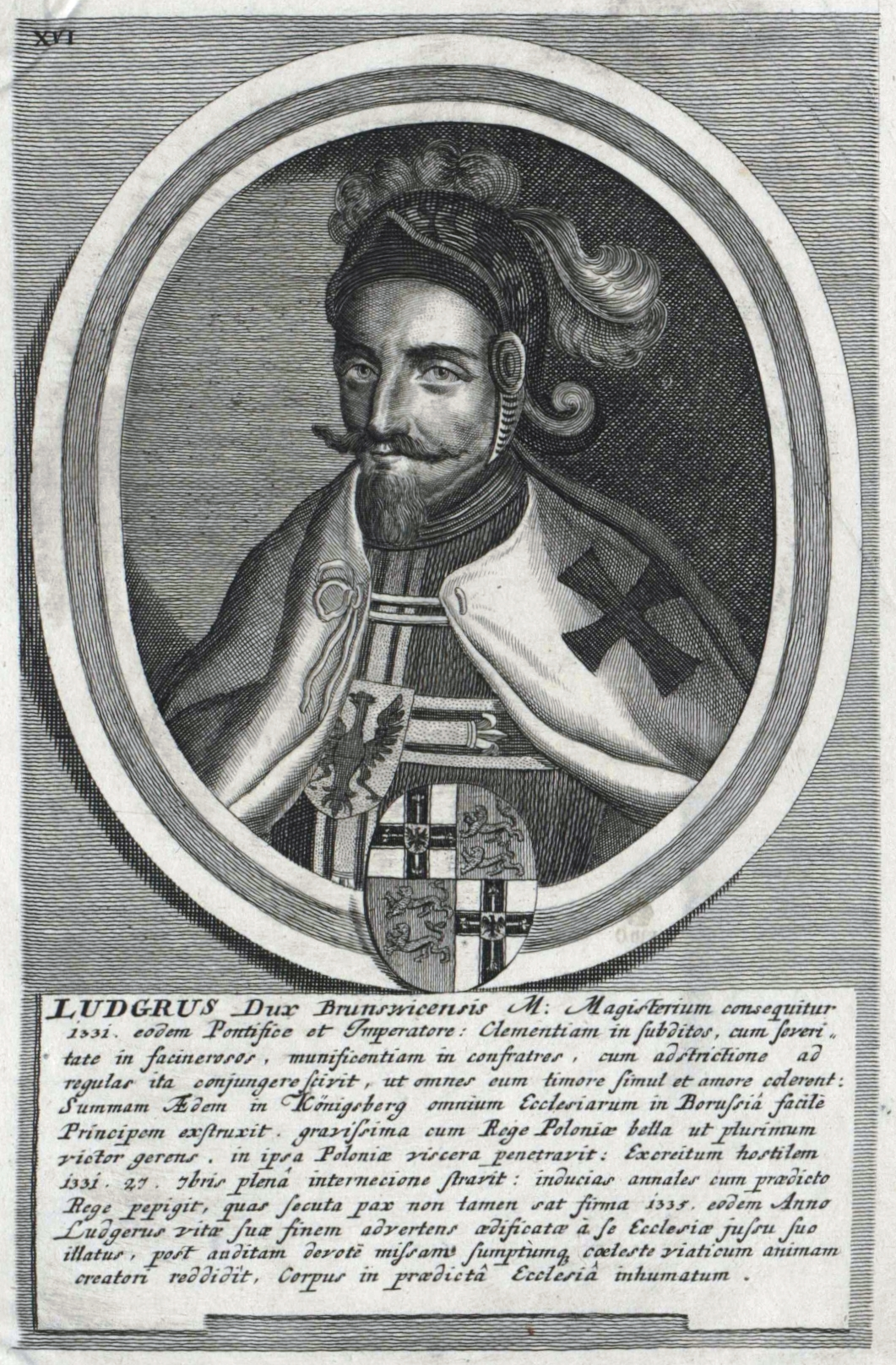
Luther von Braunschweig

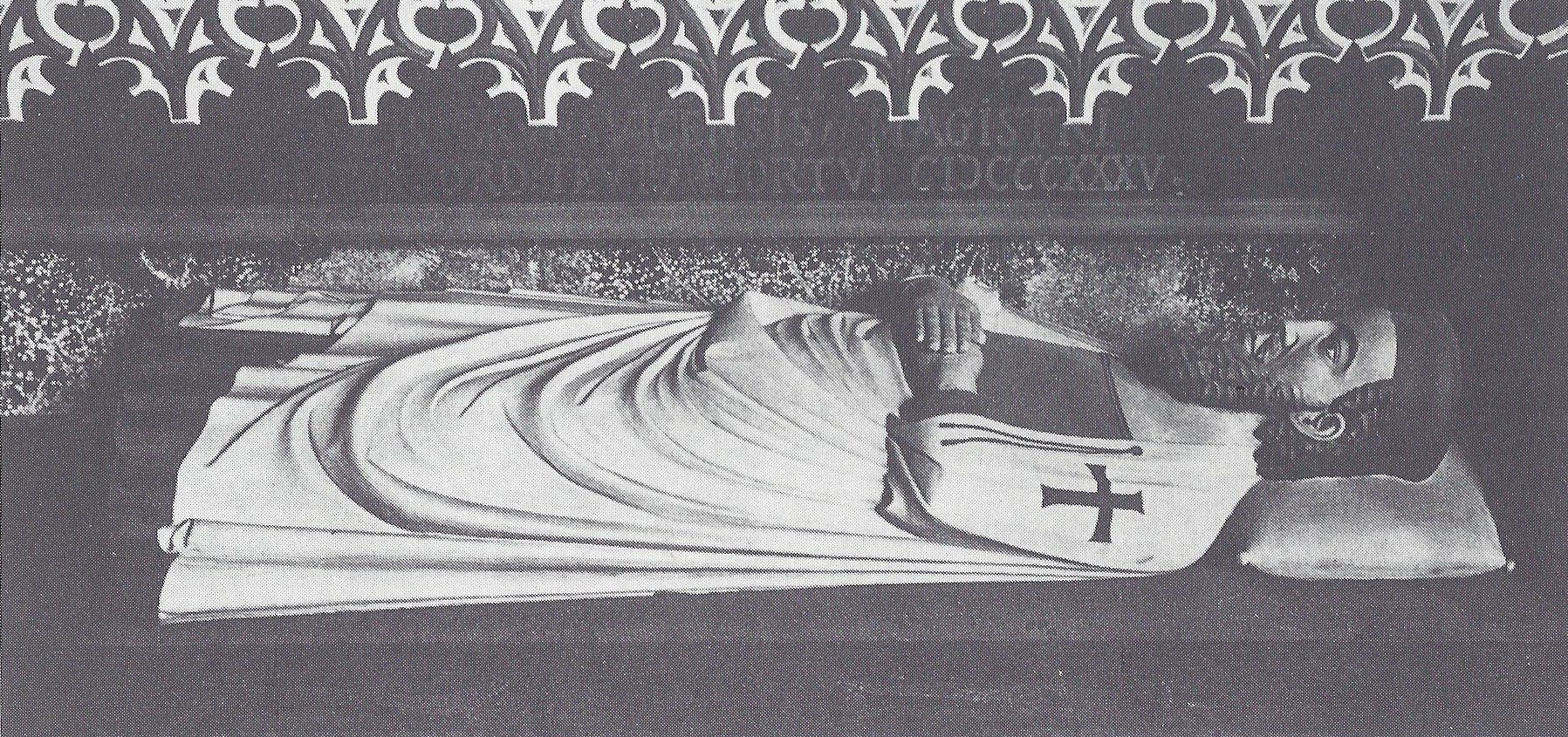
Wooden figure of Luther von Braunschweig, Königsberg Cathedral

Luther von Braunschweig (also known as Lothar of Brunswick; c. 1275 – 18 April 1335) was a German nobleman who served as the 18th Grand Master of the Teutonic Order from 1331 to 1335.

== Life ==
Luther was a younger son of the Welf duke Albert I of Brunswick-Lüneburg (1236–1279) and his second wife Adelaide (1242–1284/85), daughter of Margrave Boniface II of Montferrat. His elder brothers Henry, Albert II and William succeeded their father in the Brunswick principalities of Grubenhagen, Göttingen and Wolfenbüttel.

He was first documented as a Teutonic Knight in 1295, serving in the Prussian lands; from 1304 in the entourage of the Landmeister. From 1308 to 1312, Luther acted as Commander (Komtur) at Gollub, an important commandry in Chełmno Land. From 1313 he served as commander at Malbork Castle and in 1314 became commander of Christburg (present-day Dzierzgoń), governing large estates along the Vistula river down to the Vistula Lagoon (Frisches Haff) on the Baltic coast. He founded the town of Gilgenburg (Dąbrówno) in 1326; he also renewed the charters of Christburg, Eylau (Iława), and Saalfeld (Zalewo). In 1329 he had the commandry of Osterode (Ostróda) established. Under Luther's rule, and with the aid of the Cistercians, his territory became the most advanced commandry in the Order's State.

On 17 February 1331, he was elected Grand Master (Hochmeister), succeeding Werner von Orseln who had been killed the year before. While the Polish–Teutonic War over Pomerelia continued, again culminating in the Battle of Płowce on 27 September 1331, Luther further promoted the colonisation and Christianisation of the Order's lands. In his presence, Königsberg Cathedral was consecrated in 1333; Luther also had Malbork Castle extended and became known as a patron of the arts, such as the work of Peter of Dusburg, whose Chronicon terrae Prussiae was translated by chaplain Nikolaus von Jeroschin on his behalf.

Luther was buried in Königsberg Cathedral. His tomb was destroyed in World War II.

Grand Master of the Teutonic Order
Preceded by Werner von Orseln	Hochmeister; 1331–1335	Succeeded by Dietrich von Altenburg
