= Schutzbar genannt Milchling family =

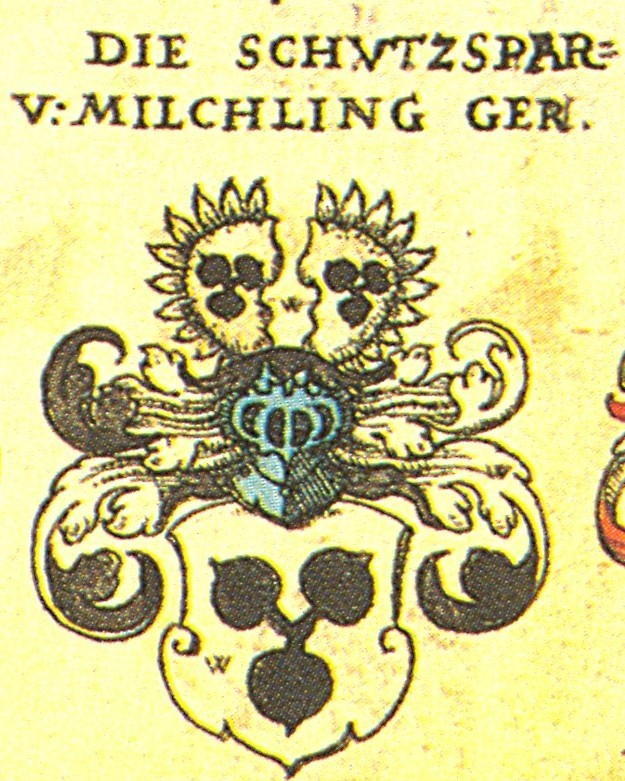
Coat of arms of Schutzbar genannt Milchling family

The Schutzbar genannt Milchling family is an ancient Upper Hesse, latterly baronial (German: Freiherr) German noble family, whose Hessian branch is still a member of the knighthood.

== History ==
The family can trace their noble lineage back to 1035 in Tries, with Eberhard Schutzspeer genannt Milchling as their earliest known ancestor. Wolfgang Schutzbar joined the Teutonic Order in 1507 and was from 1529 to 1543 Komtur of the Bailiwick of Hesse at Marburg. The family belongs to the uradel (ancient German nobility).

== Coat of arms ==
Blazon: "2:1 In Silver, three escutcheons () with trefoil stems related to black lime leaves (or balls or hearts). On the helmet a sign of two bird wings. “The mantlings are in black and silver."

== See also ==
- Anne-Marie von Schutzbar gennant Milchling
