= Burchard von Schwanden =

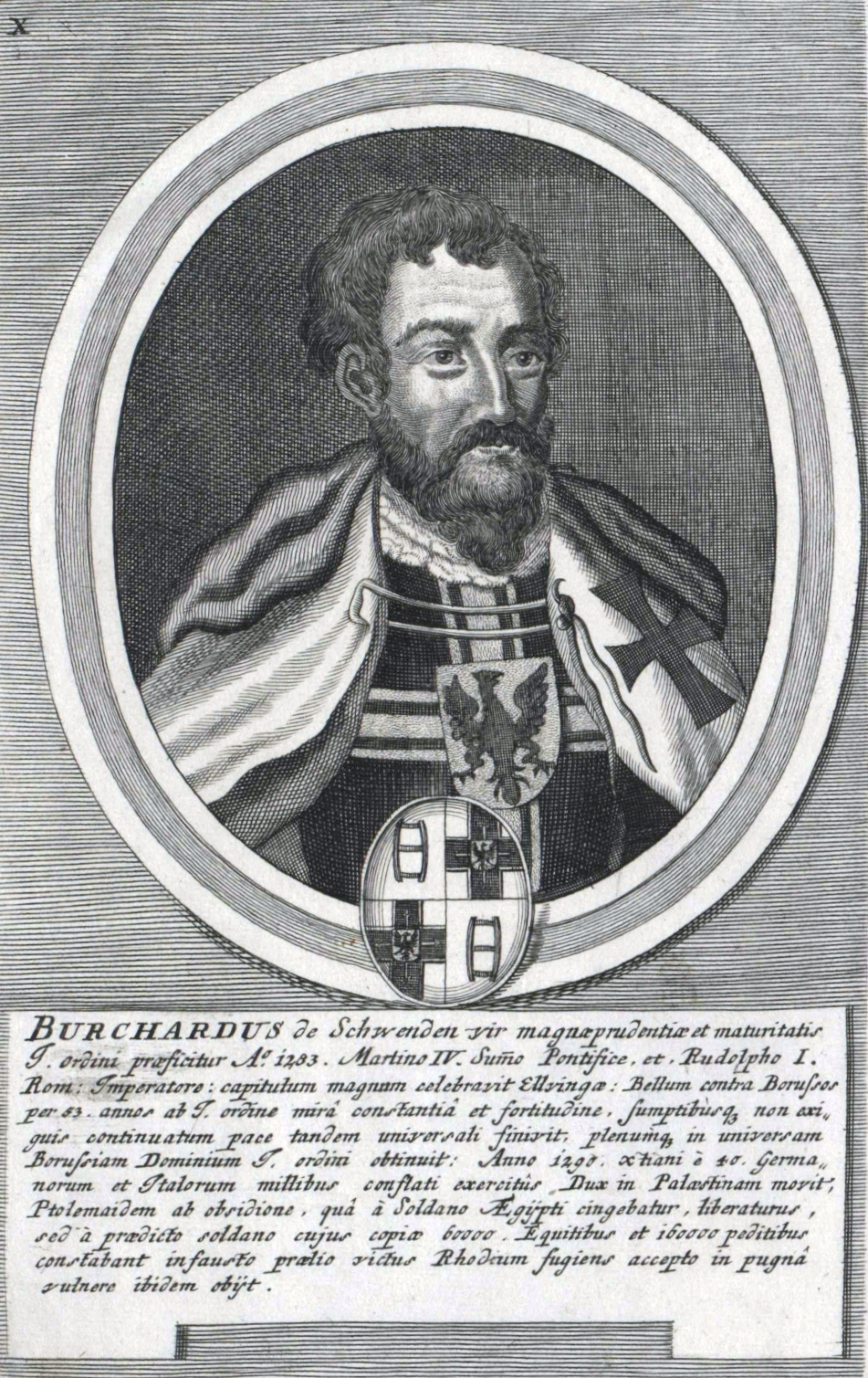
Burchard von Schwanden

Burchard von Schwanden (also Burkhard; died 1310) was the 12th Grand Master of the Teutonic Knights, serving from 1282 to 1290.

Burchard hailed from a patrician part of Bern. He was a monk in Hitzkirch before becoming the Komtur of Köniz (present Switzerland) and advancing in 1277 to the rank of a regional Komtur of Thuringia and Saxony. He became grand master in 1282.

It was during his term that the political situation of the Kingdom of Jerusalem worsened. This situation was strongly felt by the Order as its headquarters were still in Acre, but despite this, Burchard was in no hurry to help the crusaders in the Middle East, as his mind was preoccupied with matters in Prussia, Livonia, and the Holy Roman Empire.

In 1287, a Lithuanian invasion devastated much of Livonia. Burchard left for Rome in 1289 where, in the presence of the Pope, the new borders of the Monastic State of the Teutonic Knights by the Baltic Sea were drawn. Burchard also sought Pope Nicholas IV's permission for the coronation of Rudolf I of Germany.

In early 1290, Burchard was forced by the Order to help the crusaders in Acre which was under siege. An army gathered by the grand master in a hurry left for the Holy Land. Shortly after arriving, Burchard surprisingly handed over his authority to Heinrich von Bouland, Komtur of Sicily, resigned as the grand master, and left the Order for reasons unknown.

After leaving Acre, Burchard left for his native Bern where he decided to join the Knights Hospitaller and became the Komtur of Buchsee. He died in 1310, but the exact date of his death is not certain.

== Notes ==
- Burchard von Schwanden's first year in office is given as 1282 on the Teutonic Order's German site and 1283 on its Austrian site.

Grand Master of the Teutonic Order
Preceded by Hartmann von Heldrungen	Hochmeister; 1282-1290	Succeeded by Konrad von Feuchtwangen
