= Hartmann von Heldrungen =

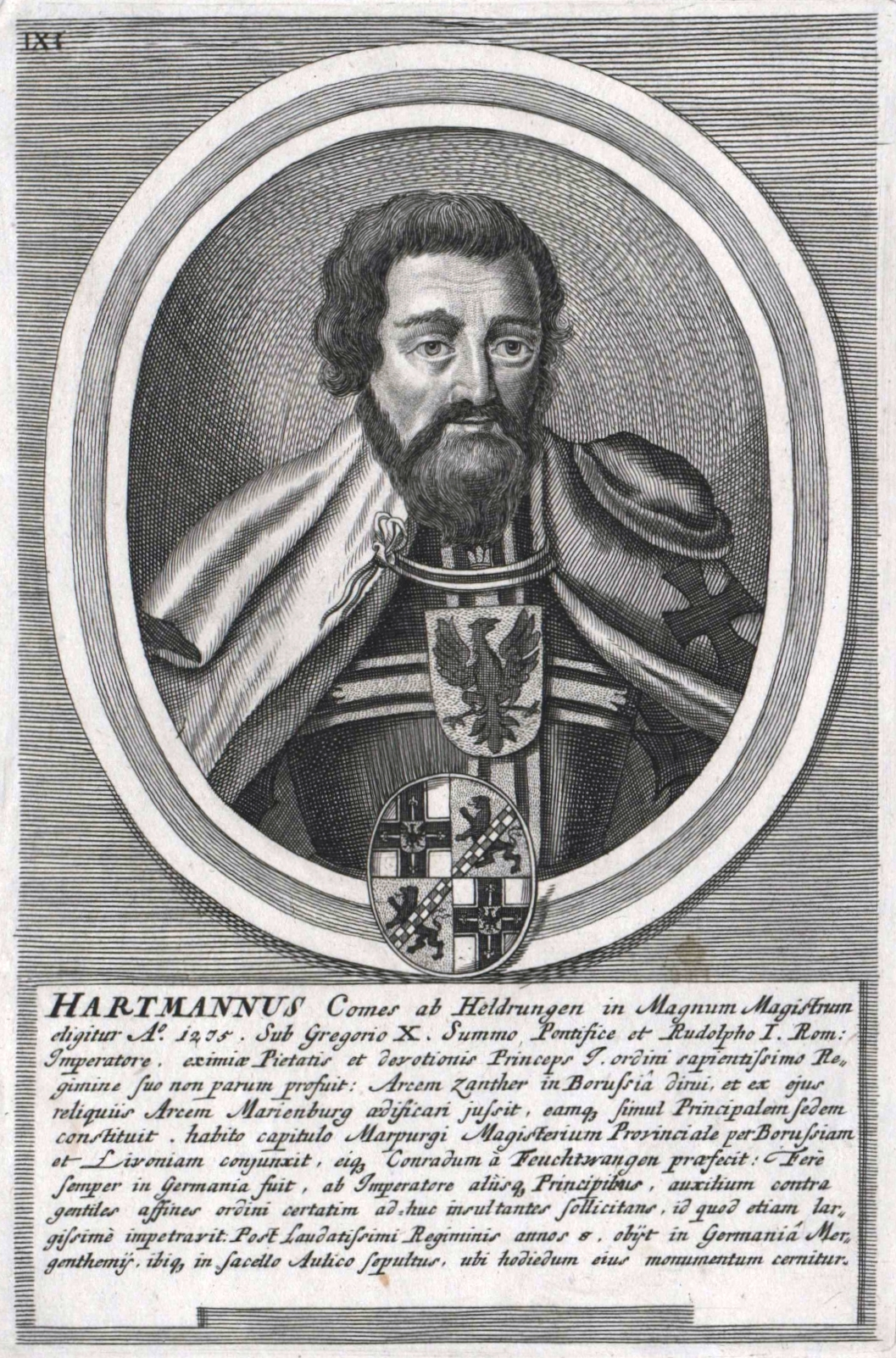
Hartmann von Heldrungen

Hartmann von Heldrungen (died 19 August 1282) was the 11th Grand Master of the Teutonic Order, serving from 1273 to 1282.

Von Heldrungen was an Imperial Knight from Thuringia in the Holy Roman Empire. He joined the Teutonic Order along with his brother Hermann von Heldrungen between 1234 and 1237.

In 1238, von Heldrungen became the Komtur in Saxony. He took part in diplomatic negotiations and celebrations when the Livonian Order joined the Teutonic Order. He was trusted by the Grand Masters and because of that, he was able to advance quickly within the Order. Between 1261 and 1266, he was the Grand Komtur and second in charge after the Grand Master, Anno von Sangershausen.

Von Heldrungen became the 11th Grand Master in the summer of 1273. His reign was marked by relative peace for the order, and he encouraged the colonization of Prussia and Livonia. He gained more lands in the empire as well as in Pomerania. He died at Acre in 1282 after fifty years in the order and reportedly at close to a hundred years in age.

Grand Master of the Teutonic Order
Preceded by Anno von Sangershausen	Hochmeister; 1273–1282	Succeeded by Burchard von Schwanden
