= Georg Hund von Wenkheim =

40th Grandmaster of the Teutonic Order

Hochmeister Georg Hund von Wenkheim OT
- Grand Master of the Teutonic Order
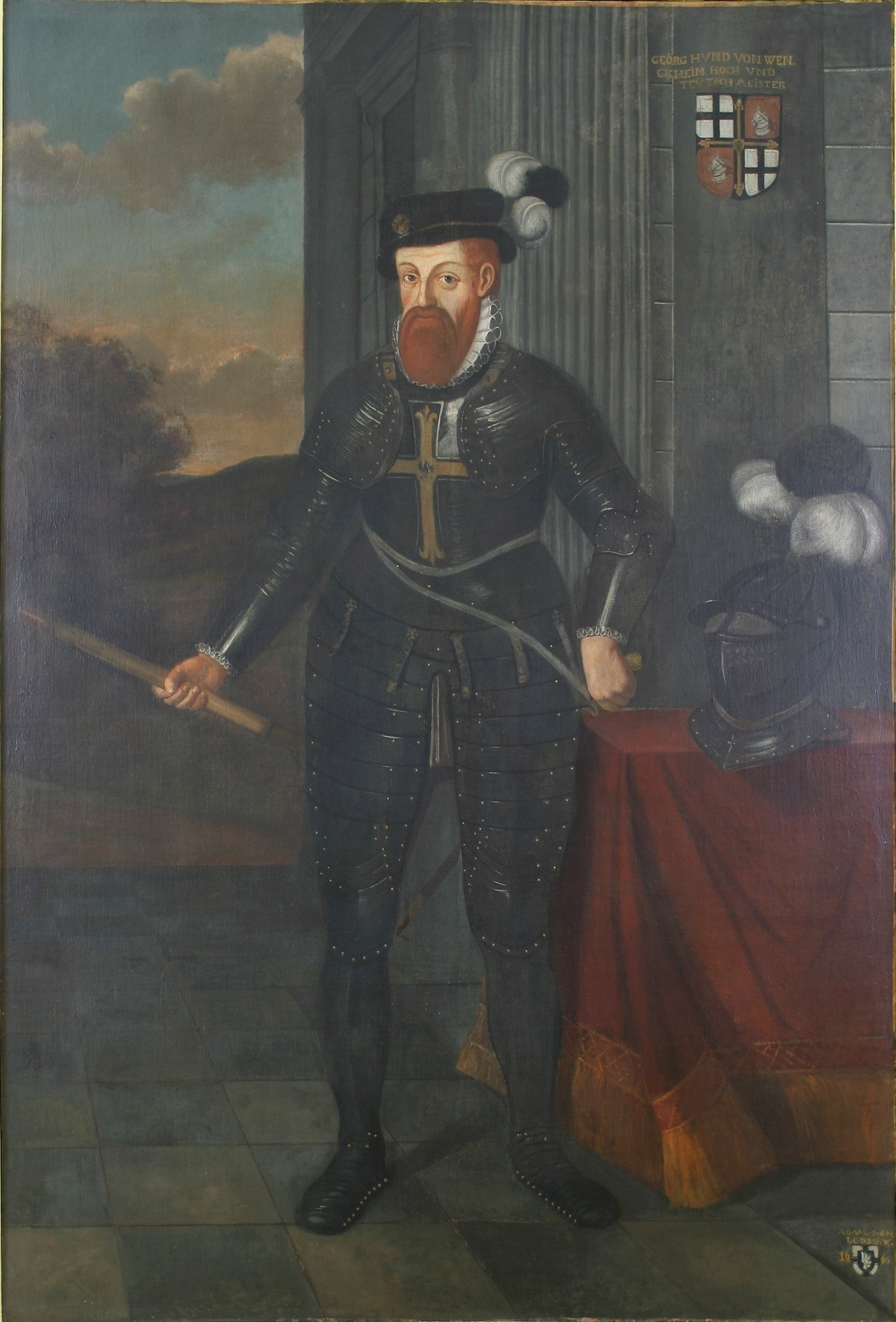
- Painting of Georg Hund from an unknown painter.
- Appointed: 1566
- In office: 1566 - June 17, 1572
- Predecessor: Wolfgang Schutzbar
- Successor: Heinrich von Bobenhausen
- Previous posts: Komtur of Wissembourg (from 1553), Komtur of Frankfurt (from 1558), Komtur of the Bailiwick of Franconia

Personal details
- Born: c. 1520 Wenkheim, Werbach, Baden-Württemberg
- Died: June 17, 1572 (aged 51–52) Bad Mergentheim
- Buried: Deutschordenskirche, Bad Mergentheim
- Denomination: Roman Catholic
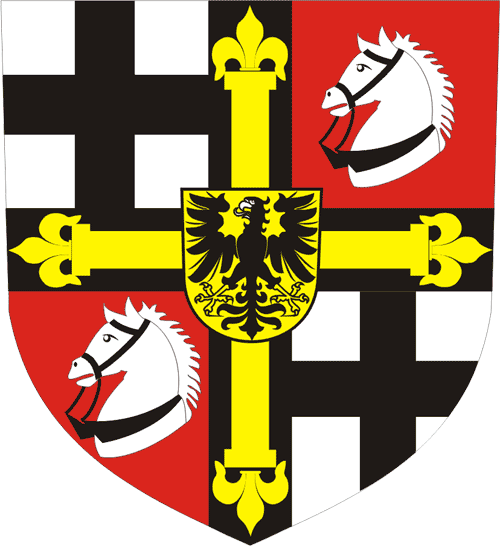
- Coat of arms

Georg Hund von Wenkheim, or Georg Hundt von Wenkheim (c. 1520 – June 17, 1572) was the 40th Grandmaster of the Teutonic Knights, reigning from 1566 to his death 1572.

== Biography ==
Georg Hund was born in Wenkheim in Franconia. He was a member of the house of Hund von Wenkheim.

By 1544, he had become a member of the Teutonic Order. He served in the city of Heilbronn until 1553, when he became Komtur of Weißenburg. In 1558, he became Komtur of Frankfurt. Prior to being elected Grandmaster in 1566, he was Komtur of the Franconian Bailiwick for a brief period.

In 1566, Georg was appointed Grandmaster of the Teutonic Knights by Holy Roman Emperor Maximilian II at Augsburg. As Grandmaster, he served as an advisor to Maximilian II and serviced the Hapsburg Family. He also organized diplomatic missions for Anna of Austria, the future wife of King Phillip II of Spain (who he was also in the service of), including a 1570 mission where Georg escorted her to Spain.

During his reign in 1568, Albert, Duke of Prussia, who was the 36th Grandmaster of the Teutonic Order that had secularized the order's territorial possessions in Prussia, died. Georg attempted to capitalize on his death as a way of reannexing Prussia for the Teutonic Knights. However, since Albert in his process of secularizing Prussia had made the duchy a Polish vassal, both the order and the Holy Roman Empire objected out of fear of starting a military conflict with Poland. As such, his wishes were largely futile, aside from being granted fiefdom rights in Prussia.

Within the order, he promoted greater unity and discipline, and attempting to remove pro-Reformation knights within the order. As a supporter of the Catholic counter-reformation, he attempted to follow the doctrine established with the 1545 - 1563 Council of Trent.

Georg Hund died on June 17, 1572. He was buried in the Teutonic Church at the Mergentheim Palace, the seat of the Teutonic Grandmaster that he spent much of his reign expanding.

Grand Master of the Teutonic Order
Preceded by Wolfgang Schutzbar	Hochmeister; 1566-1572	Succeeded by Heinrich von Bobenhausen
