= Wolfgang Schutzbar =

Grand Master of the Teutonic Order from 1543 to 1566

- Hochmeister des Deutschen Ordens
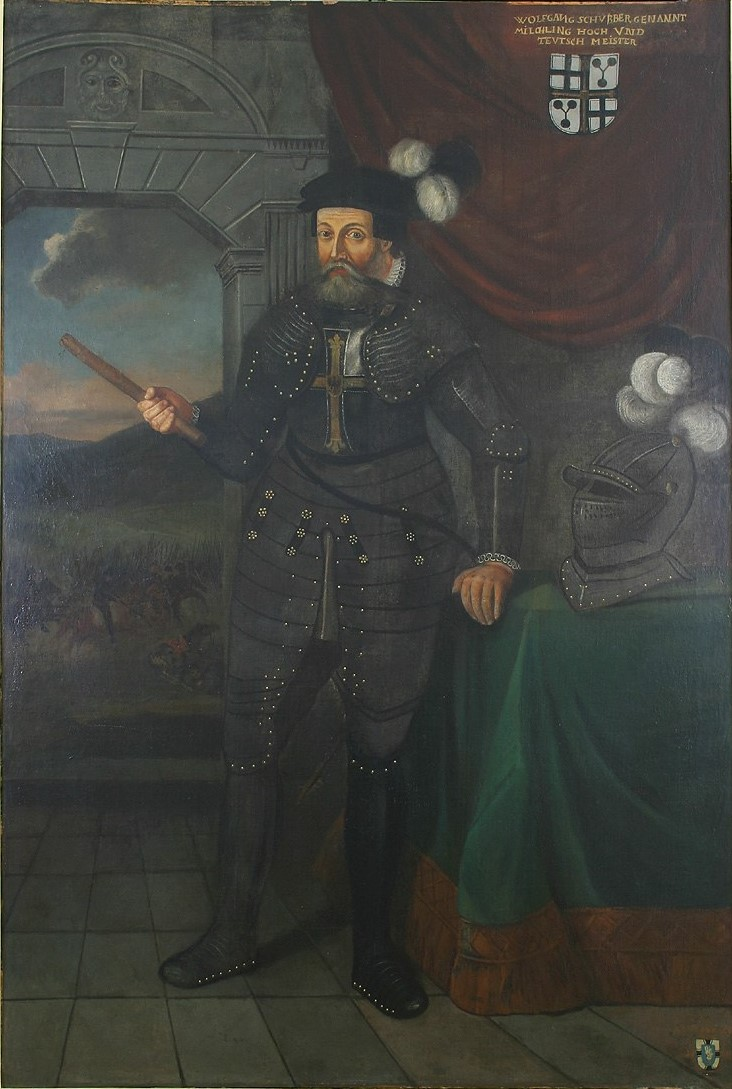
- Portrait of Schutzbar at Mergentheim Palace

Grand Master of the Teutonic Order
- Reign: 1543–1566
- Predecessor: Walter von Cronberg
- Successor: Georg Hundt von Weckheim
- Born: c. 1483; Treis an der Lumda, Holy Roman Empire
- Died: 11 February 1566 (aged 83); Mergentheim, Holy Roman Empire

Wolfgang Schutzbar (c. 1483 – 11 February 1566) was the 39th Grand Master of the Teutonic Order, serving from 1543 to 1566.

== Biography ==
Schutzbar was born in the central Hessian town of Treis an der Lumda around 1483. He hailed from the Schutzbar genannt Milchling family of old Hessian nobility. He joined the Teutonic Order in 1507 and was from 1529 to 1543 Komtur of the Bally of Hesse at Marburg.

In 1543, he became Hochmeister and Deutschmeister, a combined office located at Mergentheim. There, he built the first town hall in 1564, and the first water supply.

A monument dedicated to him is found at the local Market Square.

His coat of arms shows three hearts meeting in the center of the shield.

== See also ==
- Schutzbar genannt Milchling

Grand Master of the Teutonic Order
Preceded by Walter von Cronberg	Hochmeister; 1543–1566	Succeeded by Georg Hundt von Weckheim
