= Karl von Trier =

Karl von Trier (c. 1265 – 12 February 1324) was a German commander who served as the 16th Grand Master of the Teutonic Order from 1311 to 1324.

== Personal life and career ==
Karl came from a family of patricians of Trier and strove for a refined education. He was the eldest son of Jakob von Oeren, an alderman. He joined the Teutonic Order in 1288 along with his two brothers, Jakob and Ortolf. During the 1290s he administered the office of Komtur for both German and French bailiwicks (Champagne, Lorraine, and Burgundy). In 1304 he took on the office of Großkomtur and in this capacity became the representative in Venice of Grand Master Siegfried von Feuchtwangen.

Karl was chosen Grand Master by the order's capitulum in Marienburg in mid-June 1311. He was in favor of reforms within the order, but his endeavors met resistance. He attempted to introduce the office of conductor, whose appointees would be the only brothers able to deal in commerce and trade. There were disputes among the order's leaders led by Komtur Otto von Lutterberg and Grand Hospitaller Friedrich von Wildenberg which led to a special assembly of the order's capitulum which forced him to resign and caused him to leave Prussia in 1317.

The split within the order was averted by Pope John XXII, who condemned the dissent of the Prussian komturs and ordered them to call a new capitulum. On March 12, 1318, Karl accepted the position of Grand Master again during a general meeting in Erfurt, although he did not return to Prussia. He spent the last years of his life in Trier, where he died in 1324. He was buried in Trier's Church of St. Catherine.

Grand Master of the Teutonic Order
Preceded by Siegfried von Feuchtwangen	Hochmeister; 1311–1324	Succeeded by Werner von Orseln
