= Werner von Orseln =

14th Grand Master of the Teutonic Order

Werner von Orseln (c. 1280 – 18 November 1330) was the 14th Grand Master of the Teutonic Order from 1324 until his murder in 1330.

== Biography ==
Von Orseln hailed from a noble family of vogts (reeves) of the Counts of Falkenstein in Oberursel near Frankfurt. It is not known when he joined the Teutonic Order. He is first mentioned in 1312 holding the office of a Komtur at the Ordensburg of Ragnit (present-day Neman) near the border of the Order State with the Grand Duchy of Lithuania. In 1314, Grand Master Karl von Trier appointed von Orseln Grand Komtur at Malbork Castle. During a coup d'etat in the Monastic State, he supported the Grand Master and was exiled along with him. However, he returned in 1319 and he held the position of von Trier's resident in Prussia. He negotiated discussion and restored hierarchic discipline within the Order.

Upon the death of Karl von Trier, the Order's capitulum on 6 July 1324 chose von Orseln as the next Grand Master. Immediately after being elected, von Orseln was forced to start negotiations with King Władysław I the Elbow-high of Poland over the contested lands of Pomerelia, which the Knights had annexed after the takeover of Gdańsk in 1308. The discussions did not produce any results, however, and the Teutonic Order started preparations for war with Poland. In 1326 the Grand Master formed an anti-Polish coalition at Brodnica, consisting of the Masovian dukes Siemowit II, Trojden I and Wenceslaus of Płock as well as of several Silesian Piasts and King John of Bohemia. The pretext to start the Polish–Teutonic War gave King Władysław I by the invasion of Płock in 1327. In retaliation, the Grand Master ordered the conquest of Polish Kujavia and Dobrzyń Land.

=== Castles and Colonization ===
In 1325, according to Nicolaus von Jeroschine and his book The Chronicle of Prussia, Werner von Orslen would get his subordinates to build the castles of Gerdauen, Wartenburg, Guttstadt, and Plut, and two years later, in 1327, Werner von Orslen would also command Hermann von Oppin, who was the leader of the Teutonic hospital at Elbing, to found a town on the lake of Maurin that would end up being called Mohrungen. This creation of new towns and new castles, while inviting people from Germany and other Christian states, would create a form of colonization in the Baltic that helped to push the borders of what we now call Europe further East in a process that Pluskowski calls “Europeanisation”. This Europeanisation that von Orslen was certainly a part of would help create the Europe we know today. Historian Robert Bartlett helps to expand on why castles like this were important in his book The Making of Europe. In this book, Bartlett mostly focuses on the Norman castles and Knights that were present in the wars in Ireland; however, the blueprint is nearly identical to the Teutonic Order in terms of how castles and knights were used in order to bring people to the newly conquered lands and help hold them. On this topic, Bartlett says that “Homage and the fief came in the wake of conquest, the successful conquerors or warrior immigrants of the High Middle Ages expected a reward, and that reward was typically what they called a fief”. This quote helps to show that the castles being built by von Orslen were a crucial factor in attracting new knights to come and join the Teutons in order to gain some land and a fortress of their own, and how, in turn, they would bring their practices and contribute to the colonization of the Baltic land.

==== Blueprint for the Teutonic Orders' Europeanization of the Baltic lands ====
The first necessary piece of context that helps us understand the colonization and Europeanization of the Baltic and, by extension, the Teutonic knights is how these crusaders, who traditionally fought in the Levant, came to be in Eastern Europe. First, though it is necessary to understand that the Teutonic Order did not only make war, instead, according to Urban, they “Maintained many convents, hospitals, and churches”. Here, though, it is noted by Urban that they mainly specialized in warfare. This growing fame in both warfare and religious affairs would, according to Pluskowski, result in the order being invited to protect Hungary's border from the step warriors of the Turkic Cuman confederacy. This, according to Pluskowski, occurred because the Teutonic knights “needed to find their place in a crusading world dominated by the Templars and Hospitallers”. In this mission, the Teutonic knights, according to Pluskowski, would start to invite various Germanic peoples to come and settle the lands surrounding their newly founded castles. This plethora of Germans and other Christian groups who were invited to help settle their conquered land and fight in the Teutonic army would lead Historian Mark Whelan to describe their territory as a “Military Diaspora”. While these wars between the Teutonic Knights and Cumans could not be called a Baltic crusade, they do seemingly help lay out a basic blueprint for the methods of the Teutonic Knights that can be seen nearly identically in the conquest that would later occur on the Baltic frontier and the actions of von Orslen in his mass building of German Castles and towns.

===== Circumstances of death =====
In 1328, Headmaster Werner Von Orslen would be stabbed to death by Lord Johann of Endorf, who was also a brother of the Teutonic order, while Von Orslen was leaving the church of Marienburg in a procession. In Mary Fischer's translation of the Chronicle of Prussia, she claims that Orslen “Appears to have been murdered because of the strict measures he introduced to combat indiscipline”. While this claim may be true the Primary text, The Utrecht Chronicle by Johan Von Drongelen claims that instead the argument between Von Drongelen and Von Orslen was instead over the confiscation of two horses when he says, “He had two horses more than belonged to him on behalf of the order, and the grand master took them from him because of this Lord Johann turned sinful in an angry rage”. Whatever the reason, though, the result was the same with Von Drongelen waiting outside the Marienburg church and attacking Von Orslen with a blade of some kind and stabbing him to death, thus ending his career as Grandmaster. According to the Utrecht Chronicle, the murderer Johann would be condemned to live the rest of his life in a dungeon.

====== The Primary sources ======
The Text The Chronicle of Prussia by Nicolaus von Jeroschin is a great text for studying Werner von Orslen because of the solid aforementioned information on von Orslen, but is not without its drawbacks. Firstly, von Jeroschin was himself a member of the Teutonic Knights, who was most probably born around 1290 and died around 1341. These dates place von Jeroschin as a member of the Teutonic order not only during the life of Werner von Orseln but also as someone who easily could have met von Orseln during his tenure as the Grand master of the order, or at least as a man who could have easily been able to hear accounts of his life directly from people who knew him. This is undoubtedly a huge bonus when dealing with someone so far removed from modern times. However, as any good historian knows, being a direct part of the organization you’re writing about can easily come with certain biases, as he may not have been in a position to criticize the Teutonic order or most likely would not have had any intention of doing so in the first place. Another point that should be taken into mind when reading The Chronicle of Prussia is who exactly this text was originally written for, as that may help shed some light on the nature of the text and why it's written in the way mentioned in the previous paragraph. At the beginning of the translated volume by Mary Fischer, she lays out how basically this text was written originally as a way for normal German people and new knights/recruits to be able to read and learn about the deeds and accomplishments of the Teutonic knights. The other source used here that also helps to give solid insight into both Werner Von Orslen and the Teutonic Knights is The Utrecht Chronicle of the Teutonic Order. This text was written in the late 1400s, around 1490, by Johan van Drongelen, who was the commander of the Utrecht bailiwick, which is located in the modern-day Netherlands. This text differs from the previous text, The Chronicle of Prussia, as it was written during the late medieval decline of the Teutonic order, when a very large part of the lands held by the crusading order had already been ceded to Poland, and most of the active “crusading” of the order was long past. This text is also not based on firsthand knowledge like the previous text, but is instead a more scholarly work that is based on the writing of many previous authors of the Teutonic order from its earlier, more grandiose years. This fact helps to put the importance of this text into perspective, as the knowledge that it's based on is nowhere near as close and personal to the author as in the Chronicle of Prussia. However, the text does still contain plenty of solid insight into the Teutonic Knights' structure and the history of the grand masters, as the writer himself is once again a member of the order. Once again, though, the issue of bias presents itself as it's unlikely that a member of the order during this time would disparage their own group's structure or practices. This, however, does not detract all that much from the good information that this book does give, unlike The Chronicle of Prussia, the Utrecht Chronicle tries to give a linear narrative of the history of all the grand masters of the Teutonic Order. This is helpful because the information on Werner von Orslen himself is deeper and more complex, with a better description of both his assassination and life in general.

====== The Origins of a Teutonic State ======
The actions that occurred both in the wars of the Teutonic knights in Hungary and the Teutonic knights in the Levant, according to von Jeroschin, would in 1226 catch the attention of a Polish Duke named Conrad of Masovia, whose lands bordered Prussia and Livonia. This duke, similarly to the king of Hungary, would invite the Teutonic knights to come and help protect the borders of his domain from raids by the pagan Baltic tribes. This invitation would most likely have occurred because, according to Pluskowski, “The Teutonic Knights developed a reputation as an effective disciplined military force committed to the defense of Christendom.” With this invitation, the Duke would gift the order the lands of Kulm and Lobau and, critically, would stipulate, according to von Jeroshine, that along with Kulm and Lobau, “all the lands which they might conquer thereafter with the help of god and take from the control of the heathens” should also be theirs “in perpetuity”. This gift would also be confirmed by the pope with the added benefit that any Christian who participated in this conflict would be forgiven all their sins. Here, Pluskowski also notes that much of this favor with the pope was likely due to the Teutonic Knights' relationship with Emperor Frederick II, and likewise the Emperor's relationship with the Pope. Because of this support from the Pope and the Emperor the situation for the Knights in the Baltic would be significantly different from both the Teutonic knights' actions in the Levant and in Hungary because, instead of being under the power of a king, they would actually own the lands themselves and would be given a free hand to take control of any lands in this general area that were controlled by non-Christians. Because of this, the Teutonic knights were able to legally expand their small holdings indefinitely. This legal expansion, coupled with the pope's decree of absolution, would allow the order to attract soldiers, knights, and colonists from all over Christendom and eventually create what was essentially their own powerful autonomous state in the Baltic region.

====== Lead up to the Polish wars of von Orslen's age ======
The next piece of context that is necessary in understanding the world Werner von Orslen lived in is, of course, how the Teutonic knights went from protecting the Polish border and battling pagan tribes to fighting in full-blown wars against a Polish Lithuanian alliance. To understand this, one must realize that these wars against the Baltic people were generally not quick, outright conquests. For example, Pluskowski illuminates on this topic by showing that the area of what is roughly today the Kaliningrad Oblast took a staggering 50 years for the Teutonic order to conquer and fully pacify. On this topic, von Jeroschin notes a similar figure of years, stating that it took 53, but also notes that by the end of the conquest of this area, “there was not a single man to be found in all Prussia who was not a Christian”. This quote, along with Pluskowski, helps to show the brutal, extended nature of the fighting in these lands, where the goal seemed to have been either total annihilation or conversion. This type of continuous warfare is noted by von Jeroschin all throughout his book as he frequently mentions ambushes, massacres, and constant rebellion. Here Urban notes that the landscape of this area may have played a role in the extended nature of the conflict, as the landscape was covered in swamps and dense forest, which would have made the prevention of targeted peoples' flight difficult. This type of warfare was not limited to the Prussians, however, but would, according to von Jeroschin in 1283, expand into a war against the Lithuanians. This war with the Lithuanians would span into a multi-generational conflict that would eventually expand again to include other regional powers like Poland, which would be drawn into war with the Teutonic knights through a political union that occurred between the Polish kingdom and Lithuanians. This political union, as well as both Polish and Teutonic designs on the region of Pomerelia, which offered access to the Baltic Sea, would cause major disputes between these two regional powers. This would eventually lead to the multiple wars between the Teutonic knights and the Polish Lithuanian alliance, which Werner von Orslen would both lead and fight in.

Grand Master of the Teutonic Order
Preceded by Karl von Trier	Hochmeister; 1324–1330	Succeeded by Luther von Braunschweig
