= Johann Kaspar von Stadion =

Grandmaster of the Teutonic Order (1567–1641)

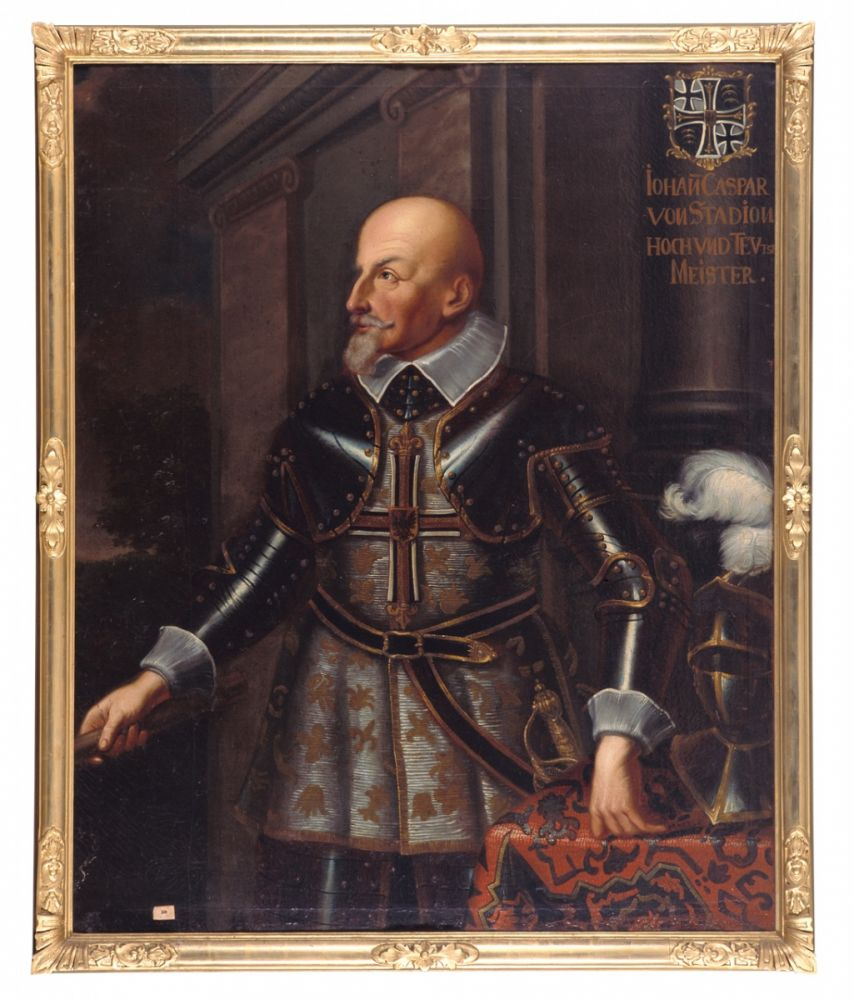

Johann Kaspar von Stadion (21 December 1567 – 21 November 1641) was a German nobleman and military leader who served as the 45th Grand Master of the Teutonic Order from 1627 until his death in 1641. He was President of the Hofkriegsrat and Privy Councilor to Emperor Ferdinand II.

== Biography ==
Johann Kaspar von Stadion came from the Alsatian branch of the noble von Stadion family. His father was Johann Ullrich von Stadion, his mother Apollonia von Nanckenreuth. He was Lord of Freudenthal and Eulenburg.
He joined the Teutonic Order in 1594 and served at the court of Maximilian III, Archduke of Austria at a young age, including during the Archduke's campaigns in the Balkans and in Hungary during the Long Turkish War. He ultimately served as his Oberstkämmerer (Chief chamberlain) and Obersthofmeister. In 1606 he was Commander in Freiburg, from 1609 to 1628 in Beuggen, in 1626 Land Commander in Alsace and in 1629 Land Commander of the Teutonic Order Bailiwick of Swabia-Alsace-Burgundy.

He was appointed Supreme War Councillor by Emperor Ferdinand II in 1619 and made a Privy Councillor in 1622. From 1619 to 1624, the first years of the Thirty Years' War, he was an advisor to Maximilian of Liechtenstein. On 30 December 1627, he was elected Grand Master of the Teutonic Order. His reign fell during the Thirty Years' War, after Gustav Adolf of Sweden had advanced into the south of the empire and after his death the Swedish general Bernhard of Saxe-Weimar had conquered Regensburg, Nördlingen and many other cities in the south of the Empire in 1633.
Johann Kaspar served as assistant councillor to Emperor Ferdinand III. He served as a military-strategic advisor and, in the summer of 1634, also participated in the recapture of the city of Regensburg from the Swedes, and subsequently in the Battle of Nördlingen.

As a reward for his loyalty to the Emperor, he was granted the County of Weikersheim, previously confiscated from George Frederick, Count of Hohenlohe, for the Teutonic Order with all its rights. Archduke Leopold Wilhelm of Austria was appointed coadjutor to the now elderly Grand Master, but he was repeatedly called upon to participate in the campaigns as a strategic and diplomatic advisor. He died on 21 November 1641 in a field camp, during preparations for another campaign of the war.

A bust of him stands in the Heroes' Alley of the Heldenberg Memorial in Lower Austria, erected in 1849.

Grand Master of the Teutonic Order
Preceded by Johann Eustach von Westernach	Hochmeister; 1627-1641	Succeeded by Leopold Wilhelm of Austria
