= Walter von Cronberg =

- Grand Master of the Teutonic Knights
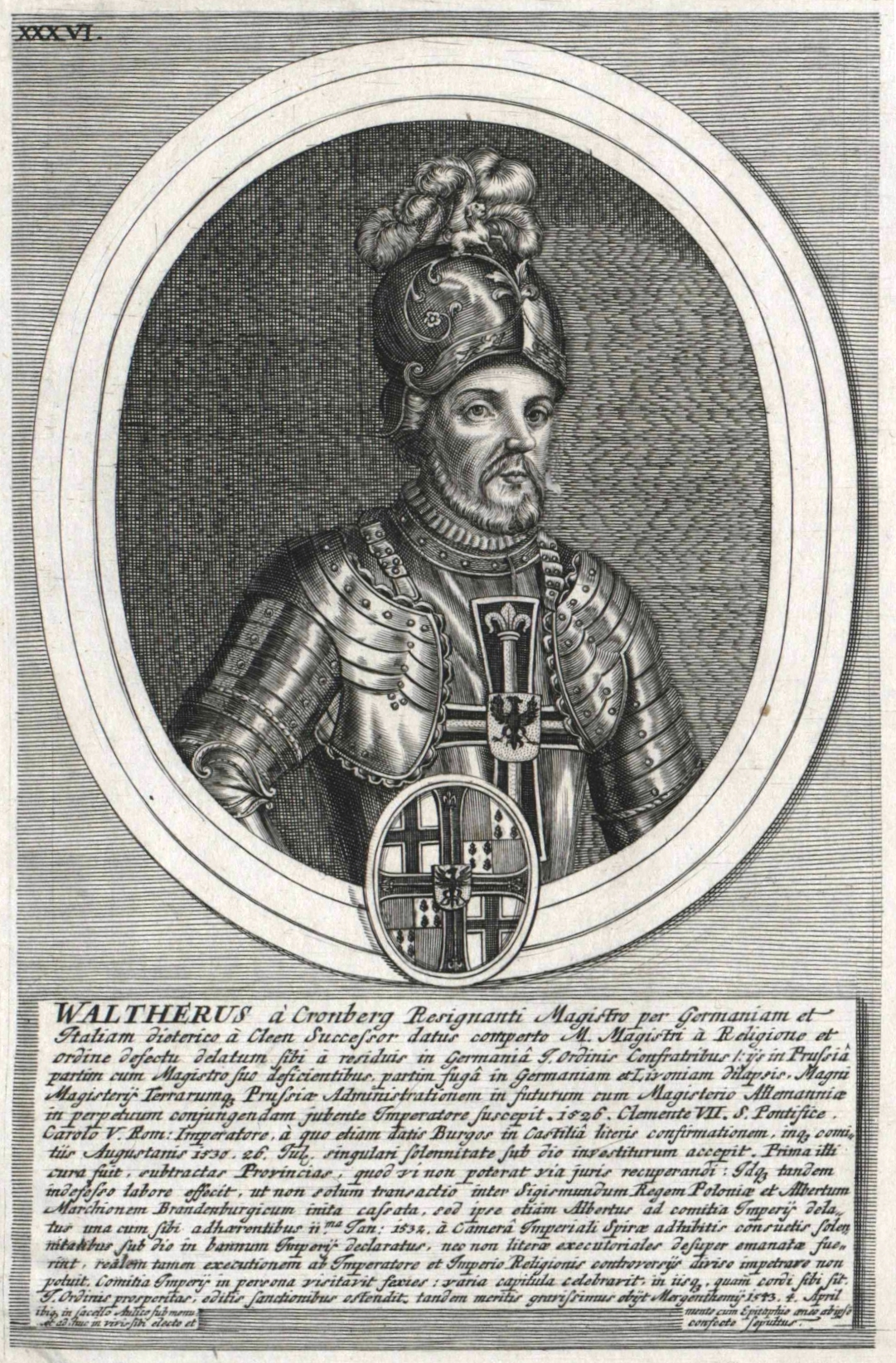

Grand Master of the Teutonic Knights
- Reign: 1527–1543
- Predecessor: Albert of Brandenburg-Ansbach
- Successor: Wolfgang Schutzbar
- Born: before 1480; Kronberg Castle
- Died: 4 April 1543; Mergentheim
- Religion: Roman Catholic

Walter von Cronberg (before 1480 – 4 April 1543) was the 38th Grand Master of the Teutonic Order, from 1527 to 1543.

== Biography ==
Von Cronberg hailed from a rather poor family of knights from Kronberg Castle near Frankfurt. He joined the Teutonic Order in 1497 and held the post of a tax collector in the Komturei of Mergentheim from 1499. He became the Komtur of Frankfurt in 1504. During the times of his predecessor, Albert of Brandenburg-Ansbach, von Cronberg was the legate to King Sigismund I (the Old) of Poland. In 1517, he founded the Brotherhood of St. Sebastian and, in 1526, he was chosen Deutschmeister (the Master of the German branch of the Order).

In 1525, when Albert had converted to Lutheranism and was excommunicated, von Cronberg declared himself the next Grand Master. His claim was based on a statute of Werner von Orseln from the 14th century, which stated that in the case of the absence of the Grand Master, the Master of one of the other branches of the Order would resume the position.

However, this decision was met with some resistance from the Master of the Livonian branch, Wolter von Plettenberg, who also laid a claim to this function. The conflict was averted by Emperor Charles V, who settled the matter in 1527 in favour of von Cronberg, declaring him "Administrator of the Office of Grand Master". Also, the claim of the Grand Master to Albert's Duchy of Prussia was renewed. As no control could be exercised there, the Grand Master's seat was moved from Königsberg to the seat of the Deutschmeister in southern Germany, Mergentheim, near Würzburg.

From 1530, von Cronberg dedicated himself to save the Catholic character of the Order. He was unsuccessful, however, in preventing further secularization of the Teutonic Order in the Holy Roman Empire, with increasingly more knights breaking the oath, by conversion to Protestantism or disobedience to the Catholic Grand Masters.

Grand Master of the Teutonic Order
Preceded by Albert of Brandenburg-Ansbach	Hochmeister; 1527–1543	Succeeded by Wolfgang Schutzbar
