= Mergentheim Palace =

German palace

- Schloss Mergentheim
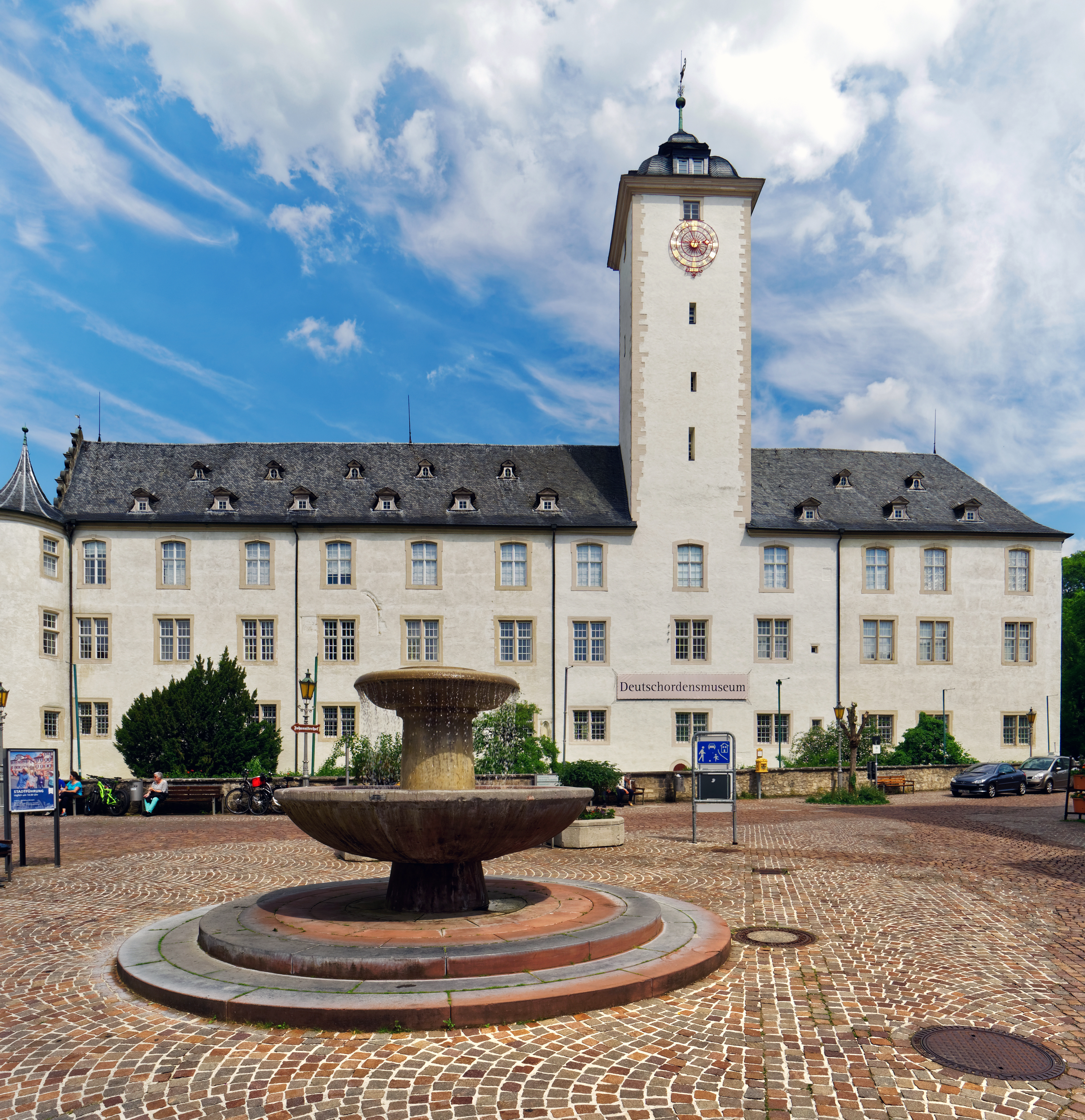
- Western facade of the palace

Map location and basic information
Location within Baden-Württemberg Mergentheim Palace (Germany)
General information
| Location | Bad Mergentheim, Germany |
| Coordinates | 49.491210°N 9.775943°E |
| Owner | Baden-Württemberg |

Website
- www.schloss-mergentheim.de/en/home

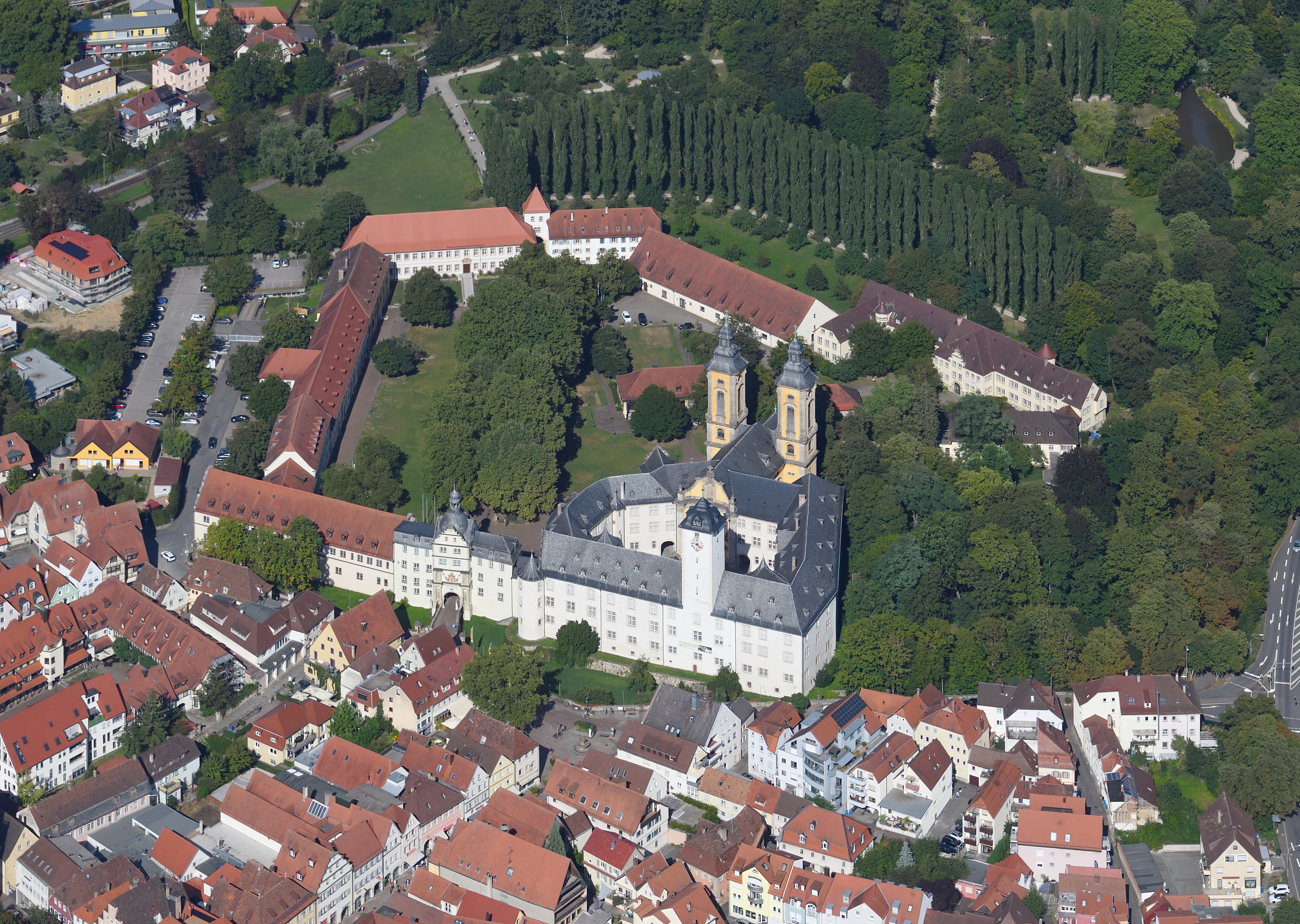
Aerial view of the Mergentheim Palace

Mergentheim Palace (Deutschordensschloss von Mergentheim) is a historic building located in Bad Mergentheim, Germany. The palace was first a castle, built in the early Middle Ages as the seat of the Taubergau, but then became a Teutonic possession in 1219, and then seat of the Mergentheim Commandery. The castle became the residence of the Grand Master of the Teutonic Order in 1527 and remained the headquarters of the Order until 1809.

== History ==
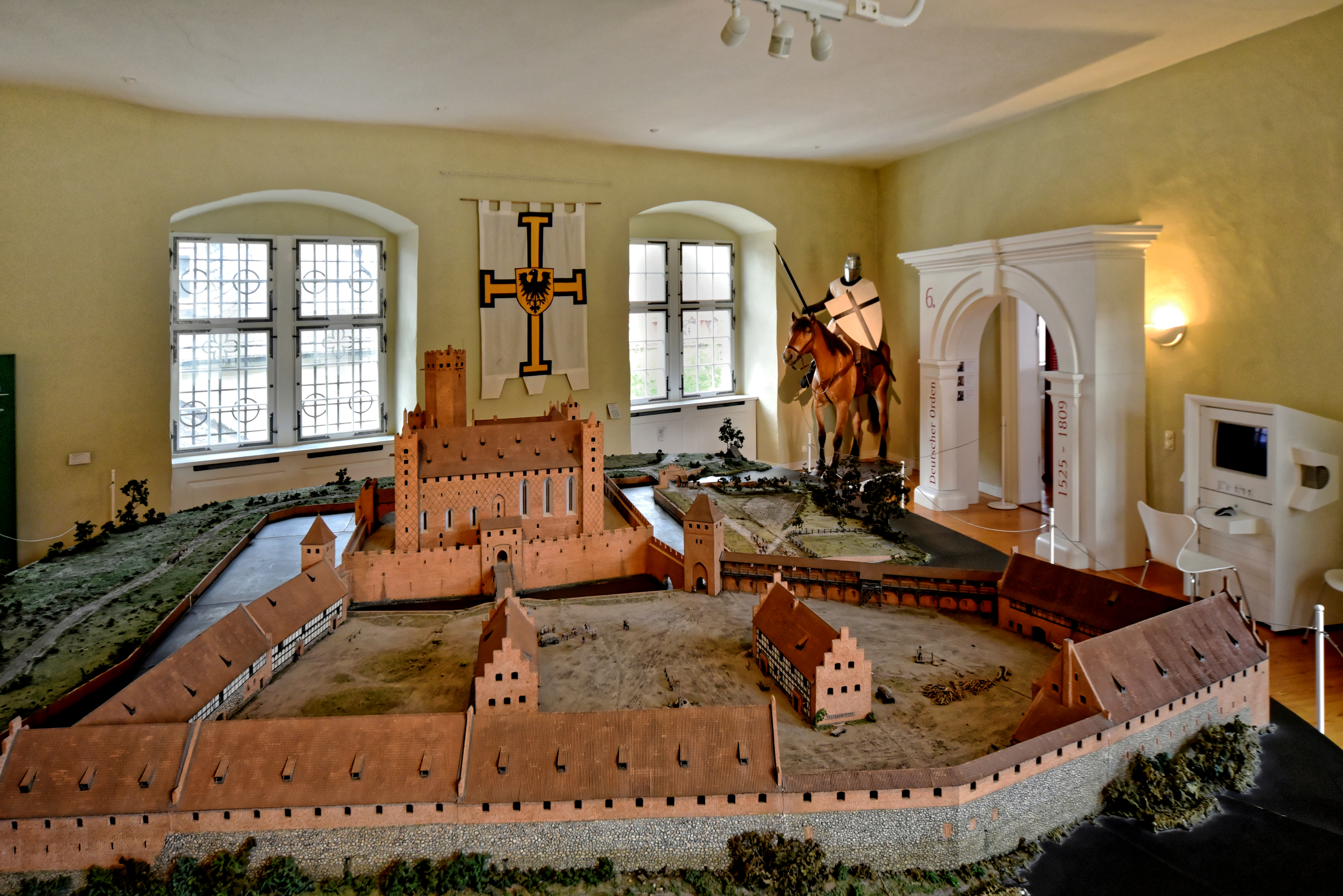
Model of Rehden Castle, a Teutonic castle in present-day Poland, in the palace museum

The history of Mergentheim Palace begins in the 12th century, when the Counts of Lauda built a castle on the east side of a village called Mergintaim. This castle was then obtained by the House of Hohenlohe, who began expanding it in 1169. In 1219 the master of the castle, Andreas von Hohenlohe, joined the Teutonic Knights with two relatives and donated Mergentheim to the Order. This transfer to the Teutonic bailiwick of Franconia was presided over by Otto I. von Lobdeburg, Bishop of Würzburg, and confirmed by Frederick II, Holy Roman Emperor. The Teutonic Knights were given extensive rights in and over Mergentheim, including the limiting of the citizenry's ability to make legal appeals to the local courts, by Louis IV, Holy Roman Emperor in 1340. By the 15th century, the Teutonic outpost at Mergentheim had 19 knights, four of whom were ordained priests.

On 26 March 1524, the citizens of Mergentheim, participating in the German Peasants' War, rose in revolt to the Teutonic Order and sacked one of their properties in the town. The gates to the town were opened to the peasants of the Tauber valley on 6 April, whereupon more looting took place and the castle was occupied. The residence of the German Master, Horneck Castle, was also attacked by Swabian peasants in 1525 and destroyed. Meanwhile, the Teutonic state in Prussia was secularized by the Kingdom of Poland. In response to the loss of Horneck Castle, the Franconian bailiwick offered Mergentheim as a residence to the German Master, Walter von Cronberg, in 1527. Cronberg accepted and that year combined the offices of the German Master and Grand Master of the Teutonic Order, making Mergentheim the headquarters of the entire Order. This arrangement was provisional until the loss of Prussia became inexorable with the destruction of the Livonian Order in 1561, obliging the Grand Master to remain in Mergentheim. 17 Grand Masters would govern the Order and its territories from Mergentheim until the Order was expelled from the town in 1809.

=== Headquarters of the Teutonic Order ===
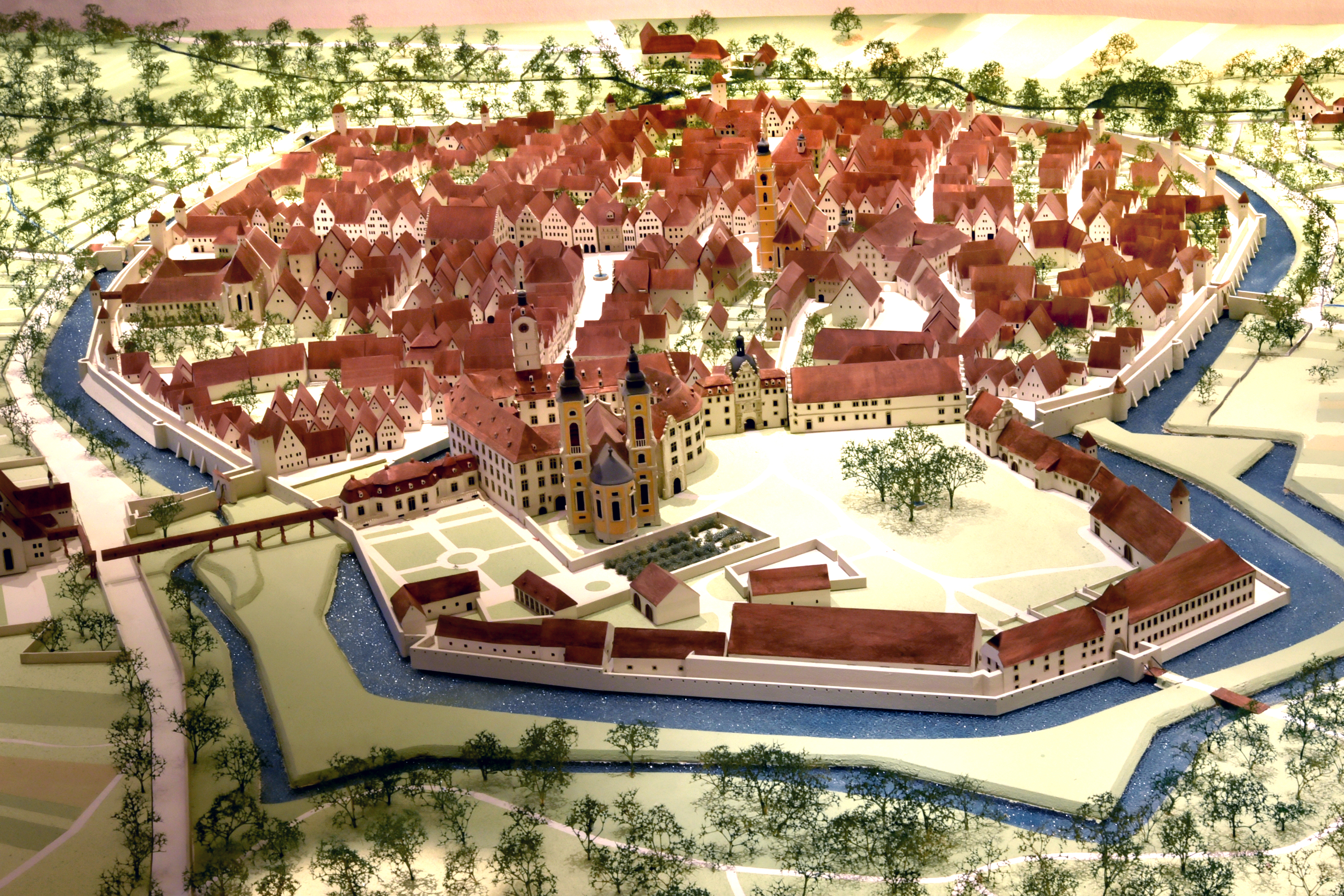
Model of Bad Mergentheim and the palace as it appeared in 1750

In 1568, Georg Hund von Wenkheim, Grand Master since 1566, began to expand Mergentheim Castle into a palatial residence. Maximilian III, Archduke of Austria, as Grand Master of the Teutonic Order, established a seminary on the grounds of Mergentheim Palace in 1606–07. It was to be staffed by 12 knights gathered from the Teutonic bailiwicks.

In 1694, Francis Louis of Palatinate-Neuburg, the Prince-Bishop of Breslau, was elected Grand Master of the Teutonic Order to replace his late brother Louis Anton. Francis Louis, who go on to hold five high ecclesiastical offices and extensively reform the Order, rarely spent time at Mergentheim. Towards the end of his tenure, however, he wrote to the Mergentheim authorities about constructing a new high altar in the palace church. When he was informed that it had fallen into disrepair, he ordered a new church. Construction began in 1730, but Francis Louis died in 1732. He was succeeded as Grand Master by Clemens August of Bavaria, who finished the church in 1736.

=== Secularization ===
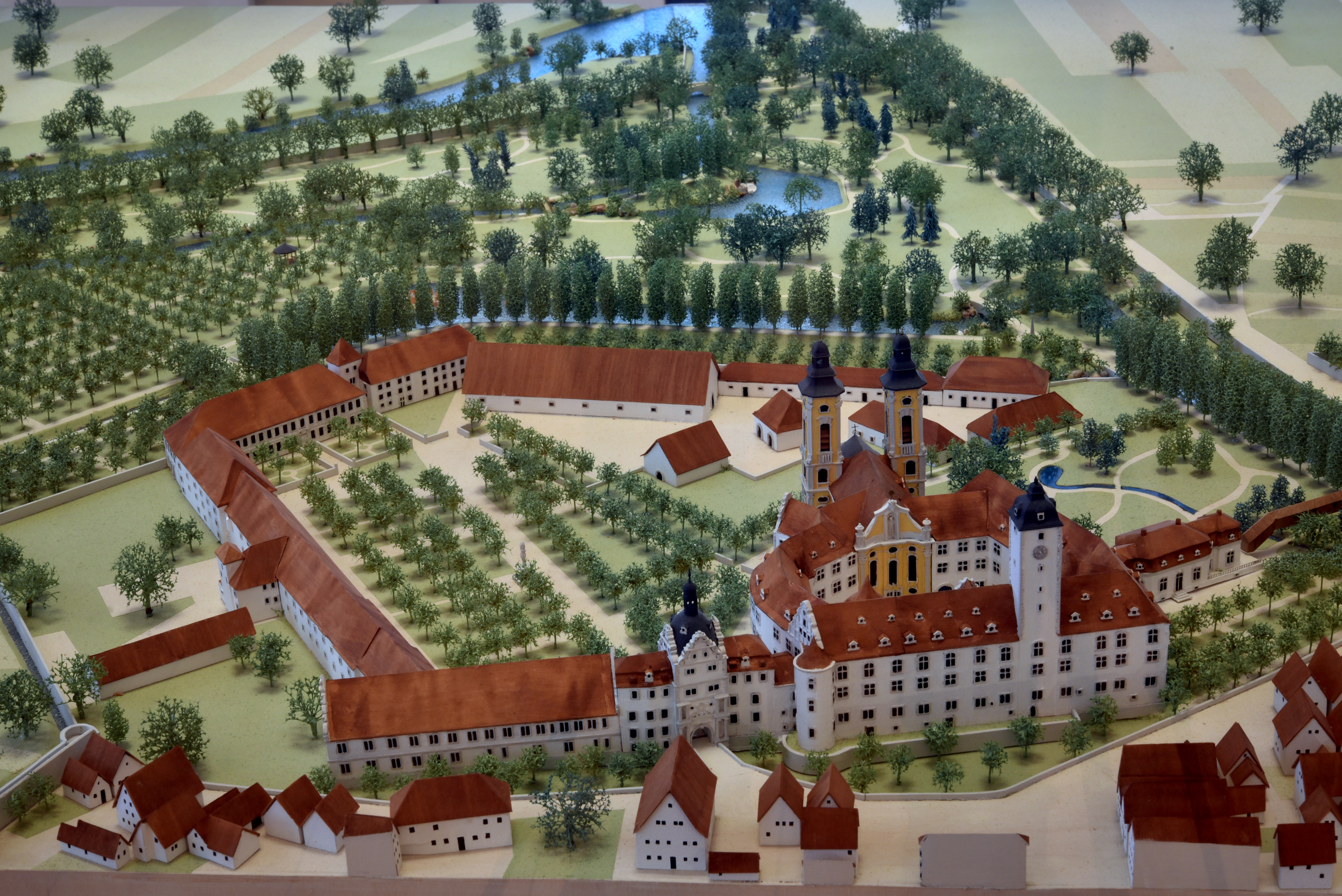
Scale model of Mergentheim Palace as it appeared around 1800

According to the 1797 Peace of Campo Formio, which concluded the War of the First Coalition, France was to annex the Left Bank of the Rhine and the German princes who lost territory to France were to be compensated with ecclesiastical possessions east of the Rhine. This compensation ballooned into the Reichsdeputationshauptschluss of 1802–03, which erased all ecclesiastical states except the Electorate of Mainz, which was moved south to Regensburg, and the Teutonic Knights at Mergentheim, and the Knights Hospitaller at Heitersheim. The ecclesiastical states were to be governed by German nobles, with the Teutonic Knights coming under Austrian control. Just two years later in 1805, at the end of the War of the Third Coalition, the Peace of Pressburg gave Mergentheim fully to Austria. Austrian troops were stationed in the town until 1809, when it was occupied by the Kingdom of Württemberg on 20 April 1809, during the War of the Fifth Coalition. In the process of German mediatization that followed in 1809, Napoleon Bonaparte stripped the Teutonic order of its possessions in what was to become the Confederation of the Rhine. Mergentheim was awarded to Württemberg on 29 May 1809 In the process of annexation, Württemberger authorities looted Mergentheim Palace and moved the seminary's library to Stuttgart, the kingdom's capital.

In 1827, Duke Paul Wilhelm of Württemberg received Mergentheim Palace as his residence following his marriage to Princess Maria Sophia of Thurn and Taxis. Paul Wilhelm, a natural scientist and explorer, displayed ethnological, zoological, and botanical specimens and curios collected in his travels in twenty of the palace's rooms. Baron Carl Joseph von Adelsheim managed the Duke's collection, and his own collection of antiquities would later form the basis of the Mergentheim Palace Museum.

=== Public property ===
As a result of the 2019-20 coronavirus pandemic, Staatliche Schlosser und Garten announced on 17 March 2020 the closure of all its monuments and cancellation of all events until 3 May. Monuments began reopening in early May, from 1 May to 17 May.

== Palace and grounds ==
The palace comprises two ringed complexes, the inner residential and the outer administrative, that together cover an area of 3,000 square meters (32,000 sq ft). The palace began as a pentagonal castle that was first enlarged in 1169. As of 2020, the oldest surviving portion of the complex are the remains of a 13th-century keep to the southeast. Beginning in 1568, the castle was expanded and rebuilt in the prevailing Renaissance style. The palace was again expanded, and remodeled in the Baroque style, by Grand Masters Francis Louis of Palatinate-Neuburg and Clemens August of Bavaria. An outer ring of buildings, farm buildings and what are now the archive building and the Trapponei, was built from the 16th to 18th centuries and, over several phases, joined into one contiguous wing.

The palace is entered through a gatehouse, which is followed in the outer ring by the archive building, then the Trapponei, an administrative building. This is followed by the carriage house, the Bandhaus, the seminary, the rear gate, the Flughaus, riding hall, a barn, and finally the orangery.

=== Inner ring ===
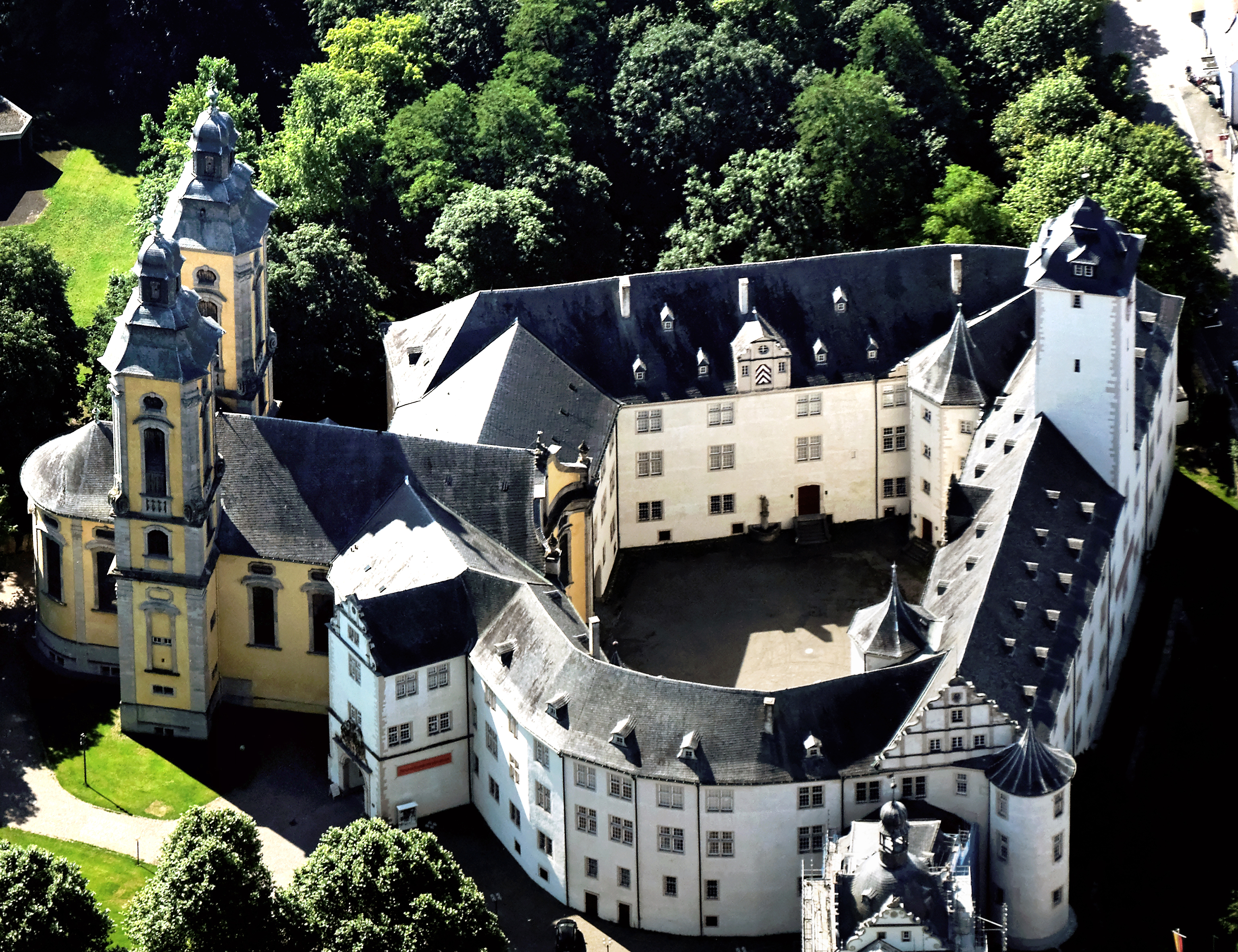
The inner, residential ring seen from above and to the north.

The palace church was designed and built from 1730 to 1736 by Franz Joseph Roth, a stuccoist from Mergentheim who received the counsel of renowned architects Balthasar Neumann and François de Cuvilliés. The ceiling fresco, Glorification of the Cross in Heaven and on Earth, was painted by Munich court painter Johann Nikolaus Stuber. The structure has a nave flanked by a choir on the east of the nave and two galleries on its west, and a royal box accessed from the second floor of the residential building. The church was consecrated on 30 September 1736 and dedicated to the Virgin Mary, Elisabeth of Thuringia, and George of Lydda. It was secularized by decree of the King of Württemberg in 1817. A crypt for the Grand Masters of the Teutonic Order was built below the church and decorated with stucco by Roth, but it was desecrated and the graves were destroyed around 1809.

=== Outer ring ===
One of the last buildings constructed on the palace grounds before its secularization was the chapter house, erected in 1780. It was commissioned by Grand Master Charles Alexander of Lorraine in 1776 and was designed by Franz Anton Bagnato, master builder of the Teutonic Bailiwick of Alsace-Burgundy. The decoration of the hall's interior is military in character, with stucco reliefs of timpani, trumpets, trophies of arms, and representative symbols for the continents of Europe, Asia, Africa, and the Americas. The illustrations in the chapter house generally glorify the history of the Teutonic Order.

=== Gardens ===
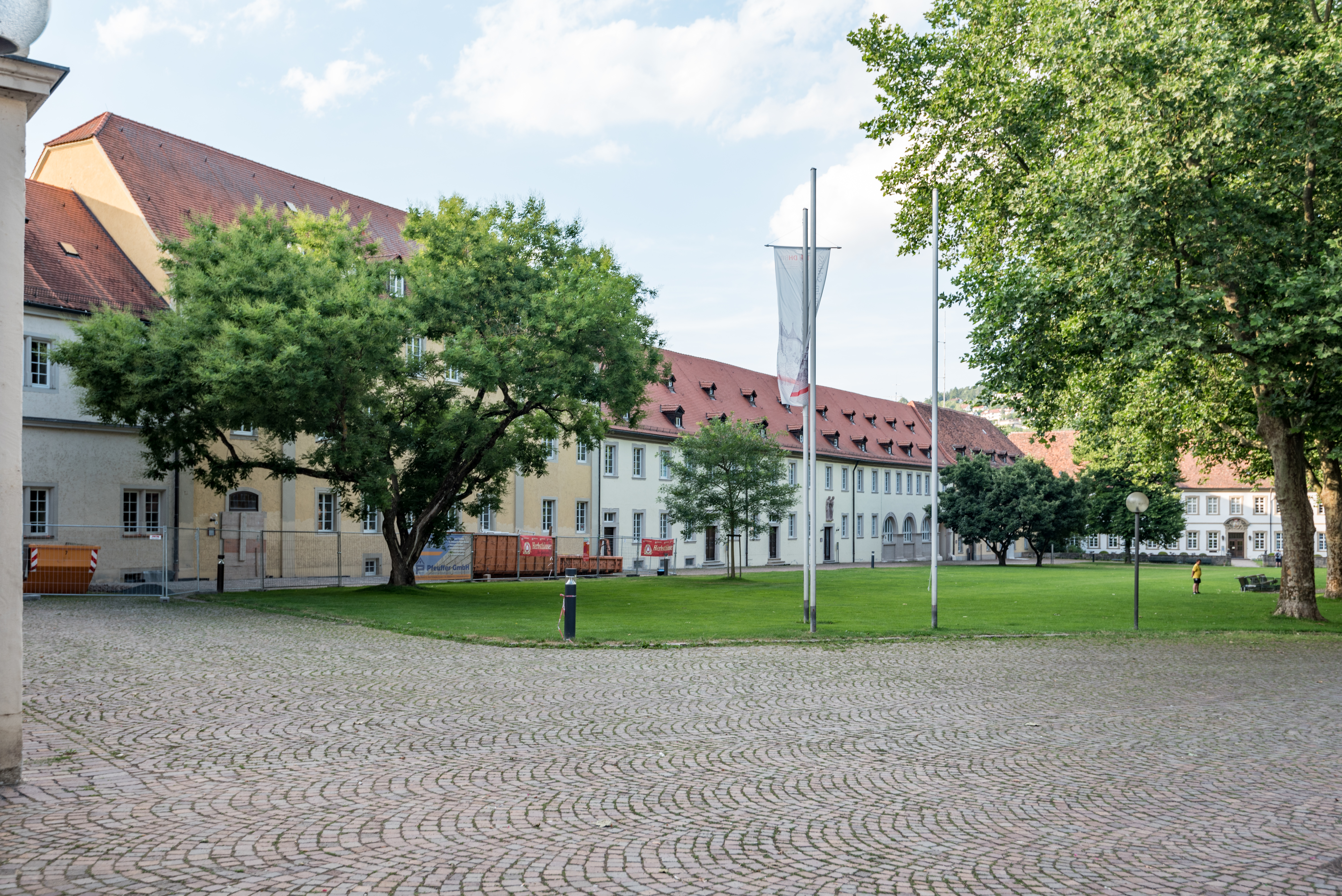
The western buildings of the administrative wing seen from the gatehouse

Mergentheim Palace has had a garden since at least 1600, when a court garden was laid out on the southern and eastern edge of the palatial grounds. From 1739 to 1745, Grandmaster Bayern had that garden replaced with a French-style garden that included an orangery and a pavilion designed by architect François de Cuvilliés. This pavilion was demolished in 1823. In 1791, Grandmaster Maximilian Francis of Austria decided replace the existing gardens with an English landscape garden. The path the garden would be laid out around was completed in 1800, while work on the garden itself was completed by 1804–05. This garden also included two new pavilions completed in 1802.

A portion of the palace gardens lies on the right bank of the Tauber, away from the palace.

=== Museums ===
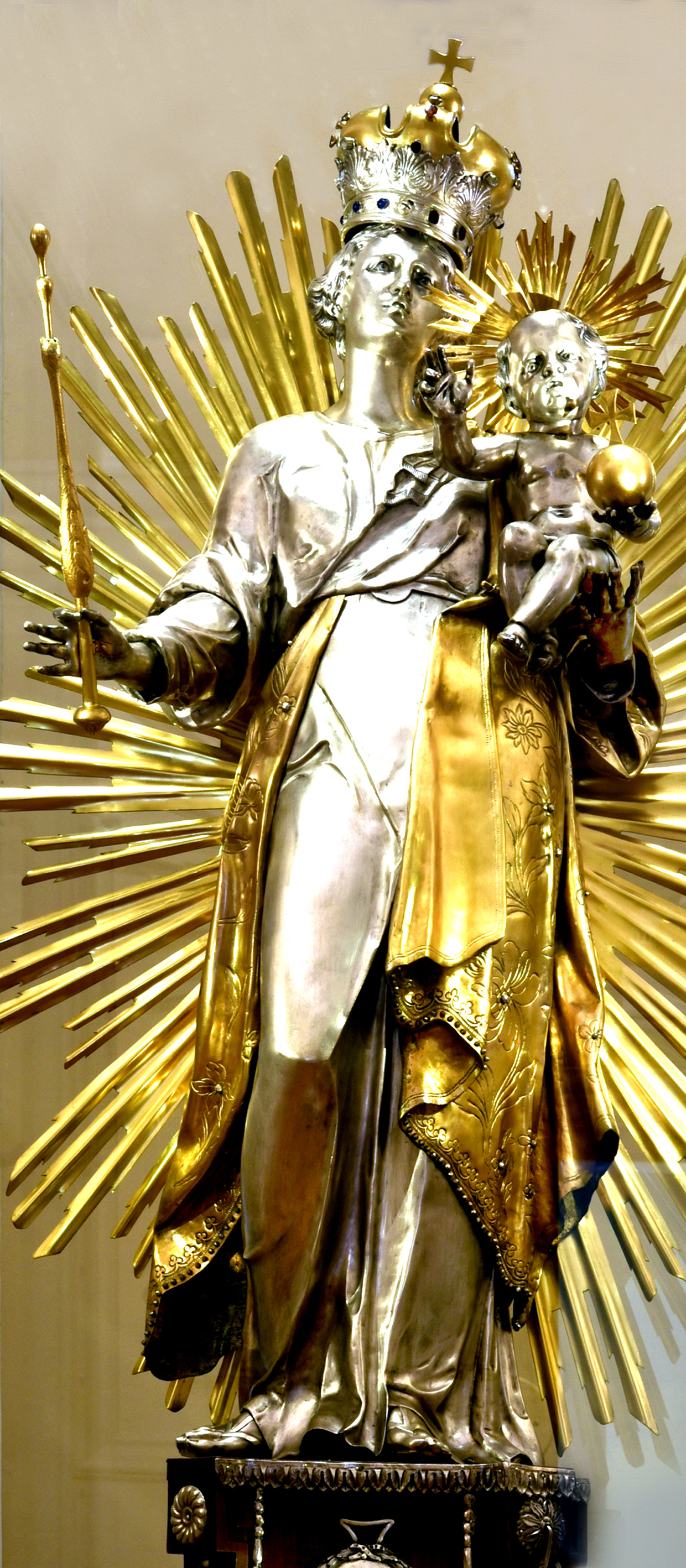
The Radiant Madonna, a gold and silver Madonna statuette produced by goldsmith Georg Stephan Dörffer from a design by Johann Peter Alexander Wagner

In 1864, Carl Joseph von Adelsheim's collection of antiquities was donated to the city of Mergentheim per his will. According to Adelsheim's wishes, the collection was displayed in a room in Bad Mergentheim's town hall, and it was expanded in subsequent years by donations. The collection was moved into Mergentheim Palace in 1927 and three years later gained the sponsorship of local history association and was rebranded into a local history museum. The focus of the museum shifted to the history of the Teutonic Knights after World War II. After a four-year renovation between 1969 and 1973, the palace museum reopened as the Teutonic Order Museum. The museum was further enlarged from 1990 to 1996 to fill the entire residential building, bringing it to a size of 3,000 square meters (32,000 sq ft).

The second floor of the residential building is filled by the exhibit dedicated to the history of the Teutonic Knights, and their legacy in popular culture. A portion of the Teutonic Order Museum is a permanent exhibit on local Jewish history, with a focus on brothers Feilx and Hermann Fechenbach, who were born in Mergentheim. Another of the museum's exhibits showcases dollhouses from the 19th and 20th centuries.

Other permanent exhibits at the palace include one dedicated to the pastor and poet Eduard Mörike, who lived in Bad Mergentheim with his sister Klara from 1844 to 1851, and a municipal history exhibit. The first of these is a collection of over a hundred items collected by the palace museum over a century. Its centerpiece is a housekeeping book that Mörike decorated with drawings that was donated to the museum in 1904 by Mörike's daughter. The municipal history exhibit is made up of twelve sections and a model of Bad Mergentheim as it appeared around 1750.

== See also ==
- Teutonic Order
