= Grand Master of the Teutonic Order =

Leader of the Teutonic Order, a medieval sect of Roman Catholicism

- Hochmeister des Deutschen Ordens
- Coat of arms of a Grand Master

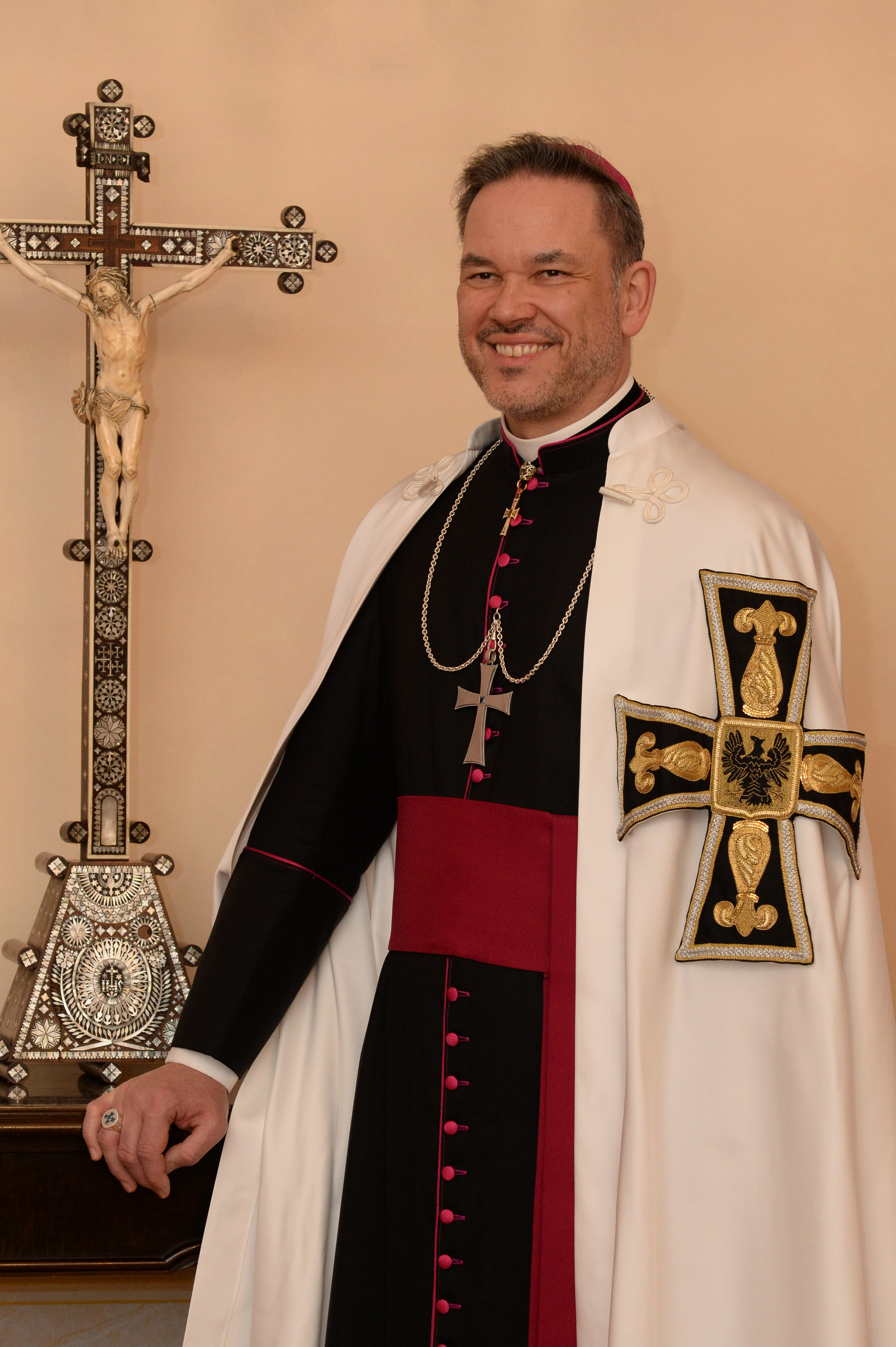
- Incumbent; Frank Bayard since 22 August 2018
- Reports to: Holy See
- Seat: Acre (1190–1291); Venice (1291–1309); Marienburg (1309–1466); Königsberg (1466–1525); Mergentheim (1525–1809); Vienna (1809–present)
- Term length: Six years
- Formation: 1198
- First holder: Heinrich Walpot von Bassenheim

The grand master of the Teutonic Order (German: Hochmeister des Deutschen Ordens; Latin: Magister generalis Ordo Teutonicus) is the supreme head of the Teutonic Order. It is equivalent to the grand master of other military orders and the superior general in non-military Roman Catholic religious orders. Hochmeister, literally "high master", is only used in reference to the Teutonic Order, as Großmeister ("grand master") is used in German to refer to the leaders of other orders of knighthood.

An early version of the full title in Latin was Magister Hospitalis Sanctae Mariae Alemannorum Hierosolymitani. Since 1216, the full title Magister Hospitalis Domus Sanctae Mariae Teutonicorum Hierosolymitani ("Master of the Hospital House of the Blessed Virgin Mary of the Germans of Jerusalem") was used.

The offices of Hochmeister and Deutschmeister (Magister Germaniae) were united in 1525. The title of Magister Germaniae had been introduced in 1219 as the head of the bailiwicks in the Holy Roman Empire, from 1381 also those in Italy, raised to the rank of a prince of the Holy Roman Empire in 1494, but merged with the office of grand master under Walter von Cronberg in 1525, from which time the head of the order had the title of Hoch- und Deutschmeister. From 1466 to 1525, the Grand Masters of the Teutonic Order were vassals and princes of the Polish Crown.

== Coat of arms ==
The coat of arms representing the grand master (Deutschmeisterwappen) is shown with a golden cross fleury or cross potent superimposed on the black cross, with the imperial eagle as a central inescutcheon. The golden cross potent overlaid on the black cross becomes widely used by the 14th century, developing into a golden cross fleury by the 15th century. A legendary account attributes the introduction of the cross potent to John of Brienne, King of Jerusalem, who granted the master of the order this cross as a variation of the Jerusalem cross, while the fleur-de-lis was supposedly granted on 20 August 1250 by Louis IX of France. While this legendary account cannot be traced back further than the early modern period (Christoph Hartknoch, 1684) there is some evidence that the design does indeed date to the mid 13th century. Each quarter divided by black cross could be fitted with either coat of arms of the Teutonic Order or the personal coat of arms of the grand master, the imperial eagle have also added coat of arms on chest between 18th–20th centuries.

== Before the Reformation ==
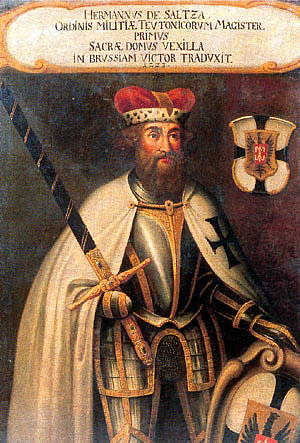
Hermann von Salza, fourth Grand Master of the Teutonic Knights, in a Baroque-era portrait

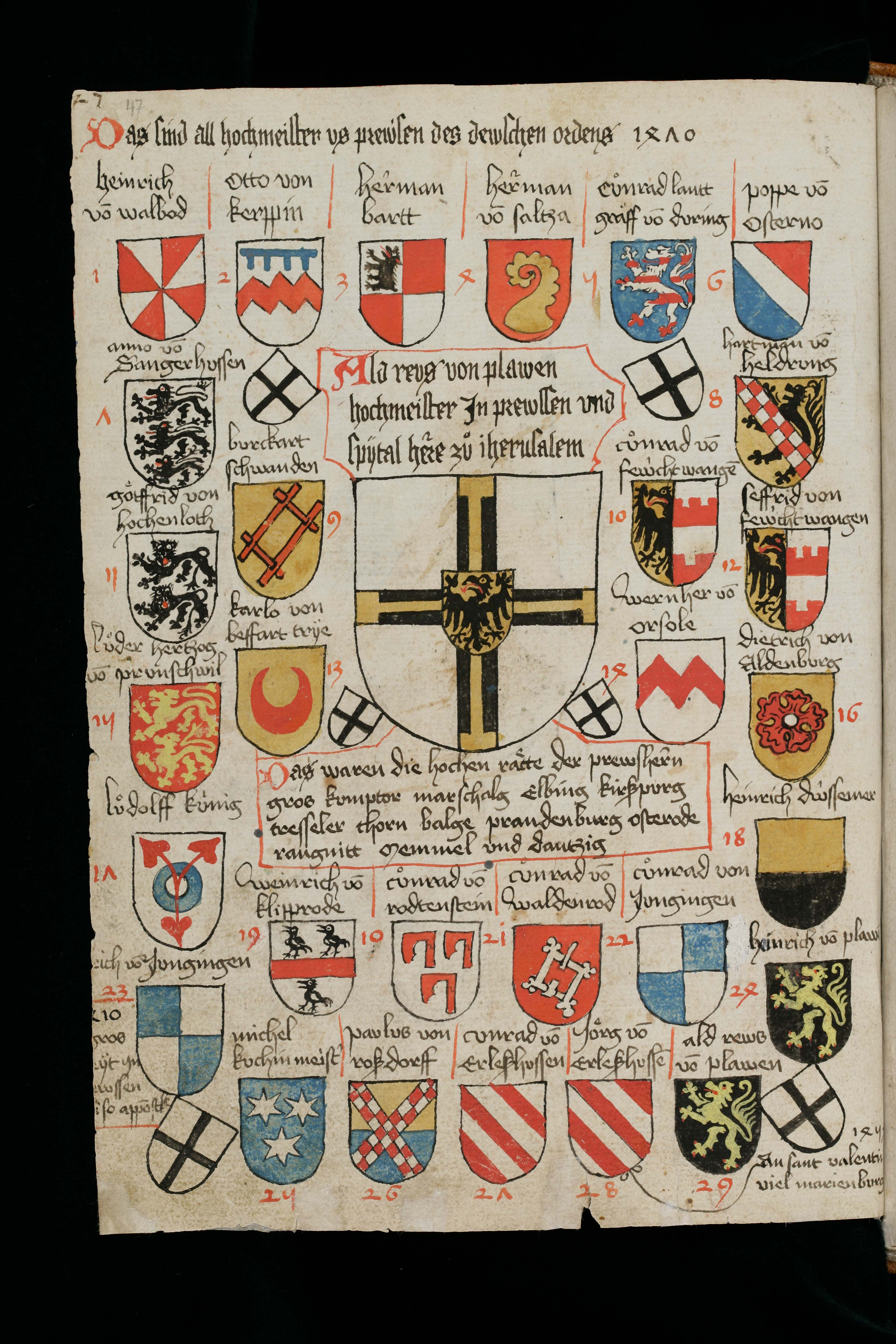
Coats of arms of the 29 grand masters (until 1470, Heinrich Reuß von Plauen) in the St. Gallen armorial (Cod. sang. 1084)

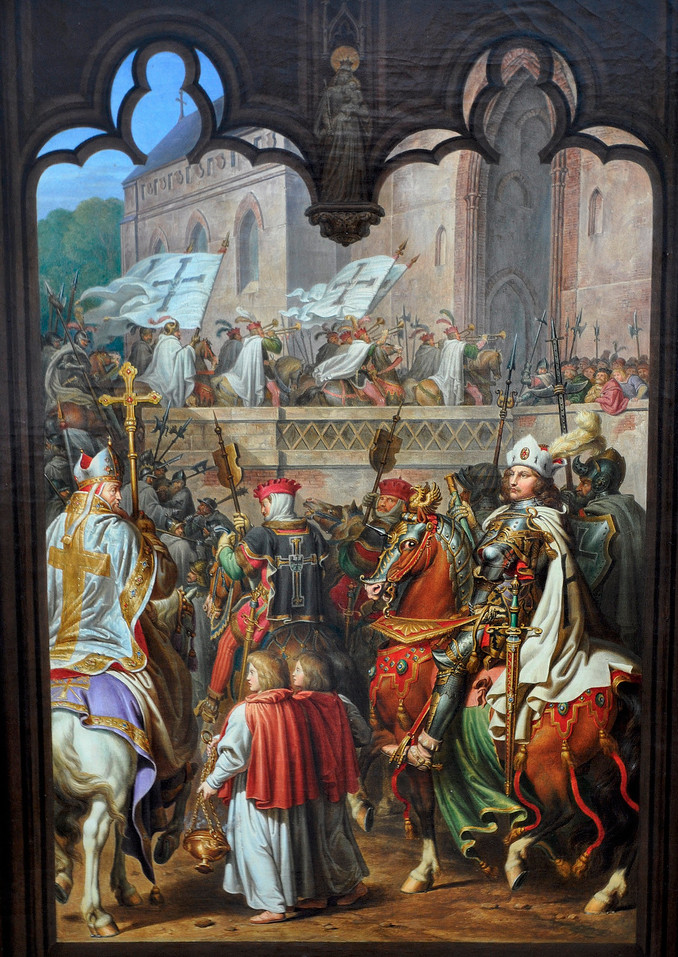
Grand Master Siegfried von Feuchtwangen enters Marienburg with his knights on 14 September 1309, representing the move of the order's main seat to Prussia (1825 history painting)

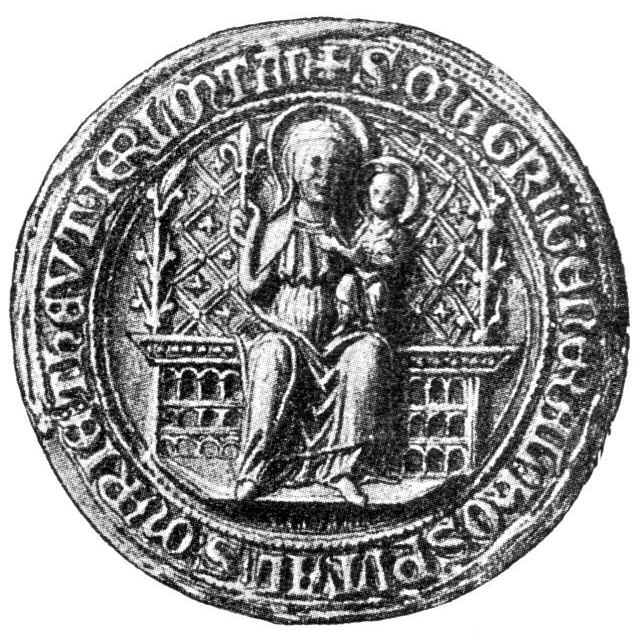
Historic seal of the Grand Master of the Teutonic Order. This seal was in use for more than 200 years, from the 13th century until it was replaced by Frederick, Duke of Saxony in 1498. (Note: In Latin: (Sigillum Magistri Generalis Hospitalis Sancte Marie Theutonicorum Ier(oso)l(o)m(i)tan(i).)

Compared to other medieval governments, transfer of power within the Teutonic Knights was run efficiently. Upon the death of a grand master, the vice master called a capitulum composed of the leading officers of the order. The general chapter would select a twelve-person electoral college composed of seven knights, four sergeants, and one priest. Once a majority-candidate for grand master was chosen, the minority electors would concede to support unanimity. These elections usually provided a succeeding grand master within three months.

Candidates for the position of grand master had experience as senior administrators for the order and were usually chosen on merit, not lineage. This changed only after the order had entered a steady decline, with the selection of Frederick of Saxony and Albert of Brandenburg-Ansbach, members of the powerful Wettin and House of Hohenzollern dynasties.

When the Teutonic Knights were originally based in Acre in Outremer, the grand masters spent much of their time at the papal and imperial courts. The grand masters were most powerful after the order's 13th century conquest of Prussia during the Northern Crusades and the creation of the militarized State of the Teutonic Order, which lasted until 1525 (from 1466 to 1525 as part of the Kingdom of Poland as a fief). After the order's capital moved from Venice to Malbork (Marienburg) in 1309, the grand master's power was at its height. He had ultimate control over Prussia, which gave him command over the Prussian commanders. When the general chapter would meet in Elbląg (Elbing), he was able to use this influence to ratify administrative measures he proposed. The grand master also served as the castellan of Marienburg and was aided by the order's treasurer. He was also a member of the Hanseatic League, allowing him to receive some of the league's custom dues.

Excavations in the church of Kwidzyn (Marienwerder) performed in 2007 yielded the skeletal remains of three Grand Masters of the late medieval period, Werner von Orseln (1324–1330), Ludolf König von Wattzau (1342–1445) and Heinrich von Plauen (1410–1413). The church had been known as the burial place of the bishops of Pomesania, but the discovery of the grand masters' burials was unexpected. The bodies had been buried in gold-painted wooden coffins draped in silk robes.

Since the 1466 Second Peace of Toruń, the Grand Masters of the Teutonic Order were vassals of the Kingdom of Poland, and every Grand Master of the Teutonic Order was obliged to swear an oath of allegiance to the reigning Polish king within six months of taking office. The Grand Masters were also princes and counselors of the Polish kings and the Kingdom of Poland. The State of the Teutonic Order was a part of Poland as a fief.

=== Leaders of the early Brotherhood, 1190–1198 ===
The Teutonic Order as a hospice brotherhood in Outremer:

Name	Reign	Born	Death	Notes
Sibrand	1190	1157	1191	
Konrad	1190–1192			
Gerhard	1192			
Heinrich	1193/1194			Prior
Ulrich	1195–1196			
Heinrich	1196			preceptor (Note: Probably identical with Heinrich Walpot, the first Grand Master (see below))

=== Grand Masters of the Order, 1198–1525 ===
The Teutonic Order as a spiritual military order had a total of 37 grand masters between 1198 and 1525.

Several armorials of the 15th and early 16th century depict the coat of arms of the grand masters. These include the Chronica by Ulrich Richenthal, an armorial of St. Gallen kept in Nuremberg, an armorial of southwest Germany kept in Leipzig and the Miltenberg armorial. Conspicuously absent from these lists are three grand masters, Gerhards von Malberg (1241–1244) and his successors Heinrich von Hohenlohe (1244–1249) and Gunther von Wüllersleben (1250–1252), so that pre-modern historiographical tradition has a list of 34 grand masters for the time before 1525 (as opposed to 37 in modern accounts).

#	Mod	Name	Reign	Born	Death	Notes
1	1	Heinrich Walpot von Bassenheim	1198–sometime before 1208		24 Sep 1200	
2	2	Otto von Kerpen	Documented for 1208		1208	
3	3	Heinrich von Tunna	1208–1209		1209	
4	4	Hermann von Salza	1209–1239	c. 1165	20 March 1239	As a friend and councillor of emperor Frederick II, Hermann achieved the recognition of the order as of equal status with the older military orders of the Knights Hospitaller and the Knights Templar by Pope Honorius III. In 1237, he also oversaw the incorporation of the Livonian Brothers of the Sword into the Teutonic order.
5	5	Konrad von Thüringen	1239–1240	c. 1206	24 July 1240	
-	6	Gerhard von Malberg	1240–1244	c. 1200	After 1245	
-	7	Heinrich von Hohenlohe	1244–1249	c. 1200	15 July 1249	
-	8	Gunther von Wüllersleben	1249–1252		3 or 4 May 1252	
6	9	Poppo von Osterna	1252–1256		6 Nov 1266 or 1267	The pretender Wilhelm von Urenbach (1253–1256) was chosen in opposition to Poppo von Osterna).
7	10	Anno von Sangershausen	1256–1273		8 July 1273	
8	11	Hartmann von Heldrungen	1273–1282		19 Aug 1282	
9	12	Burchard von Schwanden	1282 or 1283–1290		1310	Burchard von Schwanden's first year in office is given as 1282 on the Teutonic Order's German site and 1283 on the Austrian site.
10	13	Konrad von Feuchtwangen	1290–1297	Before 1230	4 July 1296	After the fall of Acre, Konrad moved the Order's headquarters to Venice.
11	14	Gottfried von Hohenlohe	1297–1303	1265	19 Oct 1310	
12	15	Siegfried von Feuchtwangen	1303–1311		1311	Of the same family as his predecessor Konrad von Feuchtwangen. Siegfried moved the order's headquarters to Prussia in 1309.
13	16	Karl von Trier	1311–1324	1265	11 Feb 1324	
14	17	Werner von Orseln	1324–1330	c. 1280	18 Nov 1330	
15	18	Luther von Braunschweig	1331–1335	c. 1275	18 April 1335	Also spelled Lothar
16	19	Dietrich von Altenburg	1335–1341		Oct 1341	
17	20	Ludolf König von Wattzau	1342–1345	Between 1280 and 1290	1348 or later	
18	21	Heinrich Dusemer	1345–1351	c. 1280	1353	
19	22	Winrich von Kniprode	1351–1382	1310	1382	
20	23	Konrad Zöllner von Rotenstein	1382–1390	c. 1325	20 Aug 1390	
21	24	Konrad von Wallenrode	1391–1393	c. 1330s	23 July 1393	
22	25	Konrad von Jungingen	1393–1407	c. 1355	30 March 1407	
23	26	Ulrich von Jungingen	1407–1410		15 July 1410	
24	27	Heinrich von Plauen	1410–1413	1360		
25	28	Michael Küchmeister von Sternberg	1414–1422	c. 1370	1429	
26	29	Paul von Rusdorf	1422–1441	c. 1385	1441	
27	30	Konrad von Erlichshausen	1441–1449	1390 or 1395	1449	
28	31	Ludwig von Erlichshausen	1449 or 1450–1467	c. 1410	4 April 1467	Ludwig von Erlichshausen's first year in office is given as 1449 on the Teutonic Order's German site and 1450 on the Austrian site.
29	32	Heinrich Reuß von Plauen	1467–1470	c. 1400	2 Jan 1470	
30	33	Heinrich Reffle von Richtenberg	1470–1477	1415	1477	
31	34	Martin Truchseß von Wetzhausen	1477–1489	1435	3 Jan 1489	
32	35	Johann von Tiefen	1489–1497		25 Aug 1497	
33	36	Frederick, Duke of Saxony	1497–1510	26 Oct 1473	14 Dec 1510	
34	37	Albert of Brandenburg-Ansbach	1510–1525	17 May 1490	20 March 1568	

== After the Reformation ==
The last Hochmeister, Albert of Brandenburg-Ansbach, converted to Lutheranism and, with the consent of his overlord and uncle, King Sigismund I of Poland, turned the State of the Teutonic Order into the secular Duchy of Prussia per the Treaty of Kraków, which was sealed by the Prussian Homage in Kraków in 1525. The commanderies in the autonomous Livonian Terra Mariana likewise were lost by 1561, as that region also became Protestant. However, the Order retained its bailiwicks in the Holy Roman Empire (Germany and Italy), which had been administered by the Deutschmeister since 1219.

As the Order was now limited to its possessions in the German kingdom, incumbent Deutschmeister Walter von Cronberg was also appointed Hochmeister by Emperor Charles V in 1527. The administrative seat was moved to Mergentheim Castle in Franconia. The Hoch- und Deutschmeister was ranked as one of the ecclesiastical Princes of the Holy Roman Empire until 1806; when Mergentheim fell to the newly established Kingdom of Württemberg, their residence was relocated to the Deutschordenshaus in Vienna. The dual title lasted until in 1923, when the last secular Grand Master, Archduke Eugen of Austria, resigned from office.

A Franconian Teutschmeister regiment of the Imperial Army was formed under Count Palatine Francis Louis of Neuburg in 1696; organized as 4th Infantry Regiment in 1769 and deployed at Vienna, it was known as the Lower Austrian Hoch- und Deutschmeister regiment from 1814. Chiefly known for its popular military band, the regiment's tradition was adopted by the Wehrmacht 44th Infantry Division in 1938 and today is maintained by the 1st Jäger Battalion of the Austrian Armed Forces.

=== Hoch- und Deutschmeister, 1527–1929 ===
Name	Reign	Born	Death	Notes
Walter von Cronberg	1527–1543	1477 or 1479	4 April 1543	
Wolfgang Schutzbar	1543–1566	c. 1483	11 Feb 1566	
Georg Hund von Wenkheim	1566–1572	c. 1520	17 June 1572	
Heinrich von Bobenhausen	1572–1590	c. 1514	21 March 1595	
Maximilian III, Archduke of Austria	1590–1618	12 Oct 1558	2 Nov 1618	
Charles of Austria, Bishop of Wroclaw	1619–1624	7 Aug 1590	28 Dec 1624	
Johann Eustach von Westernach	1625–1627	16 Dec 1545	25 Oct 1627	
Johann Kaspar von Stadion	1627–1641	21 Dec 1567	21 Nov 1641	
Archduke Leopold Wilhelm of Austria	1641–1662	5 Jan 1614	20 Nov 1662	
Archduke Charles Joseph of Austria	1662–1664	7 Aug 1649	27 Jan 1664	
Johann Caspar von Ampringen	1664–1684	19 Jan 1619	9 Sep 1684	
Ludwig Anton von Pfalz-Neuburg	1685–1694	1660	1694	
Francis Louis of Palatinate-Neuburg	1694–1732	18 July 1664	6 April 1732	
Prince Clemens August of Bavaria	1732–1761	17 Aug 1700	6 Feb 1761	
Prince Charles Alexander of Lorraine	1761–1780	12 Dec 1712	4 July 1780	
Archduke Maximilian Francis of Austria	1780–1801	8 Dec 1756	26 July 1801	
Archduke Charles, Duke of Teschen	1801–1804	5 Sep 1771	30 April 1847	
Archduke Anton Victor of Austria	1804–1835	31 Aug 1779	2 April 1835	Office becomes hereditary to the Imperial House of Austria
Archduke Maximilian of Austria-Este	1835–1863	14 July 1782	1 June 1863	
Archduke Wilhelm Franz of Austria	1863–1894	21 April 1827	29 April 1894	
Archduke Eugen of Austria	1894–1923	21 May 1863	30 Dec 1954	End of hereditary status
Norbert Klein	1923–1929	25 Oct 1866	10 March 1933	Bishop of Brno from 1916 until 1926

=== 1929–present ===
Time of the Teutonic Order as a clerical Roman Catholic religious order

Name	Reign	Born	Death	Notes
Norbert Klein	1929–1933	25 Oct 1866	10 Mar 1933	Bishop of Brno from 1916 until 1926
Paul Heider	1933–1936	21 June 1868	25 January 1936	
Robert Schälzky	1936–1948	13 August 1882	27 January 1948	
Marian Tumler	1948–1970	21 October 1887	18 November 1987	
Ildefons Pauler	1970–1988	9 November 1903	9 January 1996	
Arnold Wieland	1988–2000	1 August 1940		
Bruno Platter	2000–2018	21 March 1944		
Frank Bayard	2018–present	11 Oct 1971		

== See also ==
- Bailiwick of Utrecht of the Teutonic Order
- Grand master (order)
- Grand Master of the Order of Saint Lazarus
- Grand Masters and Lieutenancies of the Order of the Holy Sepulchre
- List of grand masters of the Knights Hospitaller
- List of grand masters of the Knights Templar
- Mergentheim (History), a former residence
