= Commander (order) =

Rank within military orders of knighthood

Commander (Italian: Commendatore; French: Commandeur; German: Komtur; Spanish: Comendador; Catalan: Comanador; Portuguese: Comendador), or Knight Commander, is a title of honor prevalent in chivalric orders and fraternal orders.

The title of Commander occurred in the medieval military orders, such as the Knights Hospitaller, for a member senior to a Knight. Variations include Knight Commander, notably in English, sometimes used to denote an even higher rank than Commander. In some orders of chivalry, Commander ranks above Officier (i.e. Officer), but below one or more ranks with a prefix meaning 'Great', e.g. Grand- in French, Grosskomtur in German, Gran Comendador (using an equivalent suffix) in Spanish, Grande Ufficiale in Italian, and Groot- in Dutch (Grootcommandeur, 'Grand Commander'), Grand Cross.

== France ==
=== History ===
The rank of commandeur in the French orders comes from the Middle Ages military orders, in which low-level administrative houses were called commanderies and were governed by commandeurs. In the Modern Age, the French Kings created chivalric orders which mimicked the military order's ranks.

- The Order of the Holy Spirit, created in 1578 by king Henry III, had two categories of commanders.
  - Ecclesiastical commanders: members of the clergy with the rank of prelate. They were eight, but the grand almoner of the King was counted as a supplementary ecclesiastical commander ex officio.
  - Administrative officers: the "officers-commanders" were the four most important executive officers of the order. They had the same rank as lay knights, but they needed not to prove their nobility. These offices were used by the Kings to honor recent nobles, such as Jean-Baptiste Colbert. The officers-commanders were sometimes called grand officers, in order to distinguished them from the lowest rank of officers.
- The Order of Saint Louis, created in 1694 by King Louis XIV, had one rank of commanders. This was the second highest rank of the order, destined to honor military officers. They were only 24 commanders at a time, eventually promoted to the rank of Grand Cross.

Both orders were suppressed in 1830 by the new King Louis-Philippe I.

=== Modern merit orders ===
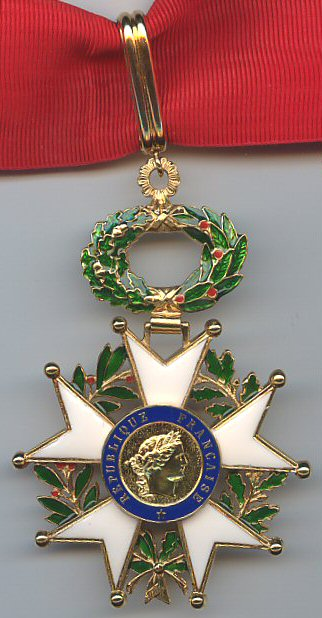
Insignia of the rank of Commander in the Legion of Honor

- The Legion of Honour, created in 1802 by Napoléon Bonaparte, was hereditary on the grandchildren descendants of his siblings, and originally had a rank of Commandant. This rank was renamed Commander by King Louis XVIII in 1816 in order to bring the Napoleonic order on monarchical guidelines. This is still the third highest rank of the order.
- The Ordre national du Mérite, created in 1963 by President Charles de Gaulle, has the same rank structure as the Legion of Honor. The Commanders form the third highest rank of the order.
- The Ordre des Palmes académiques, created in 1808 for teachers and professors, has Commander as its highest rank since reorganization in 1955 by President René Coty.
- The Order of Agricultural Merit, created in 1883 for contributions to agriculture, has Commander as its highest rank since reorganization in 1900.
- The Ordre du Mérite Maritime has had Commander as its highest rank since its creation in 1930.
- The Ordre des Arts et des Lettres has Commander as its highest rank since its creation in 1957.

== Italy ==
The title of Commendatore ("Knight Commander") in the Order of Merit of the Italian Republic (originally established by the royal House of Savoy) and other orders of knighthood is awarded by decree of the President of Italy. The rank of Commendatore (Knight Commander) is a higher award than Ufficiale (Officer), which in turn is higher than Cavaliere (Knight), the first level in this order of chivalry. The Italian government's orders are exceptional to the international standard in that they do not officially have special ranks or decorations for females (Dames).

The rank of Commendatore is also bestowed in several Italian dynastic orders of the royal houses of Savoy, the Two Sicilies, Parma, and Tuscany. The Republic of Italy officially recognizes the orders and titles conferred upon its citizens from the Holy See and from some of the royal houses of Italy.

Commendatore is also the Italian translation for the rank of Knight Commander in foreign orders, such as the Order of the British Empire.

Il Commendatore is also a character in Mozart's Don Giovanni, and was additionally commonly used to refer to Enzo Ferrari. In the movie The Godfather Part III, Michael Corleone is addressed as Commendatore Michael Corleone on his return to Sicily since he received a Papal order of knighthood.

In the Italian Armed Forces, the military rank of Commander is Comandante.

== Germany ==
In German, Komtur (derived from Latin: commendator) was a rank within military orders, especially the Teutonic Knights. In the State of the Teutonic Order, the Komtur was the commander of a basic administrative division called Kommende (also Komturei). A Komtur was responsible for feeding and supporting the Order's Knights from the yield of local estates. He commanded several Procurators. A Kommende had a convent of at least 12 brothers. Various Kommenden formed a Ballei province.

Grosskomtur (or Großkomtur, 'Grand Commander') was one of the highest ranks within the Knights responsible for the administration of the Order and second-in-command after the Grand Master. He had his seat at Malbork Castle (German: Marienburg, now in Poland). Grosskomtur and four other senior officers like the grand marshal were appointed by the Grand Master and formed the council of Großgebietiger with competence on the whole order.

In postwar Germany the ranks of the Order of Merit were named with totally new terms. The equivalent to a commander is the Great Cross of Merit and the equivalent to a Knight Commander is the Great Cross of Merit with the Star and Sash (Großes Verdienstkreuz mit Stern und Schulterband)

== Papal orders ==
As for the Papal orders, it is also applied in the Sovereign Military Order of Malta (in its Order pro merito Melitensi bestowed for merit) and the Order of the Holy Sepulchre. Traditionally, the analogous rank for ladies is Dama di Commenda ('Dame commander'), but today the word Commendatrice is sometimes used.

== United Kingdom ==
United Kingdom is distinguished by its use of differentiating Commander and Knight or Dame Commander.

Knight Commander or Dame Commander is the second most senior grade of seven orders of chivalry, three of which are dormant (and one of them continues as a German house order). The rank entails admission into knighthood, allowing the recipient to use the title 'Sir' (male) or 'Dame' (female) before his or her name. In the Commonwealth Realms orders and decorations, Knight Commander and Dame Commander rank before Knights Bachelor but after the Order of the Companions of Honour, although Members of the Order of the Companions of Honour obtain no knighthood or other status.

In the Royal Victorian Order and the Order of the British Empire, the grade of Commander is senior to the grade of Lieutenant and Officer, respectively, but junior to that of Knight Commander or Dame Commander. In the British Venerable Order of Saint John, a Commander ranks below a Knight. However, Knights of the Venerable Order of St John are not entitled to the style of Sir.

The orders, from highest to lowest, that award the rank of Knight and Dame Commander, and related post-nominal letters, are (dormant orders are in italics):

- Order of the Bath (KCB/DCB)
- Order of the Star of India (KCSI)
- Order of St Michael and St George (KCMG/DCMG)
- Order of the Indian Empire (KCIE)
- Royal Victorian Order (KCVO/DCVO)
- Order of the British Empire (KBE/DBE)

Knights Commander and Dames Commander rank behind the most senior rank in each order, that of Knight Grand Cross. The third most senior rank in each order is Companion (CB, CSI, CMG, CIE), Knight (KH) or Commander (CVO, CBE). Insignia include a breast star, and a badge on a ribbon.

== Spain ==
In military orders with extensive territorial possessions, individual estates could be called commenda and entrusted to an individual knight, as a de facto fief. Apart from cases where such a fief was ex officio linked to a higher office within the order, his style would then be Commandeur; this etymology is best preserved in the Spanish form Commendador, important in the military orders involved in the Reconquista such as the Order of Santiago.

== See also ==
- Grand Master (order)
