= Zwätzen =

District of Jena in Thuringia, Germany

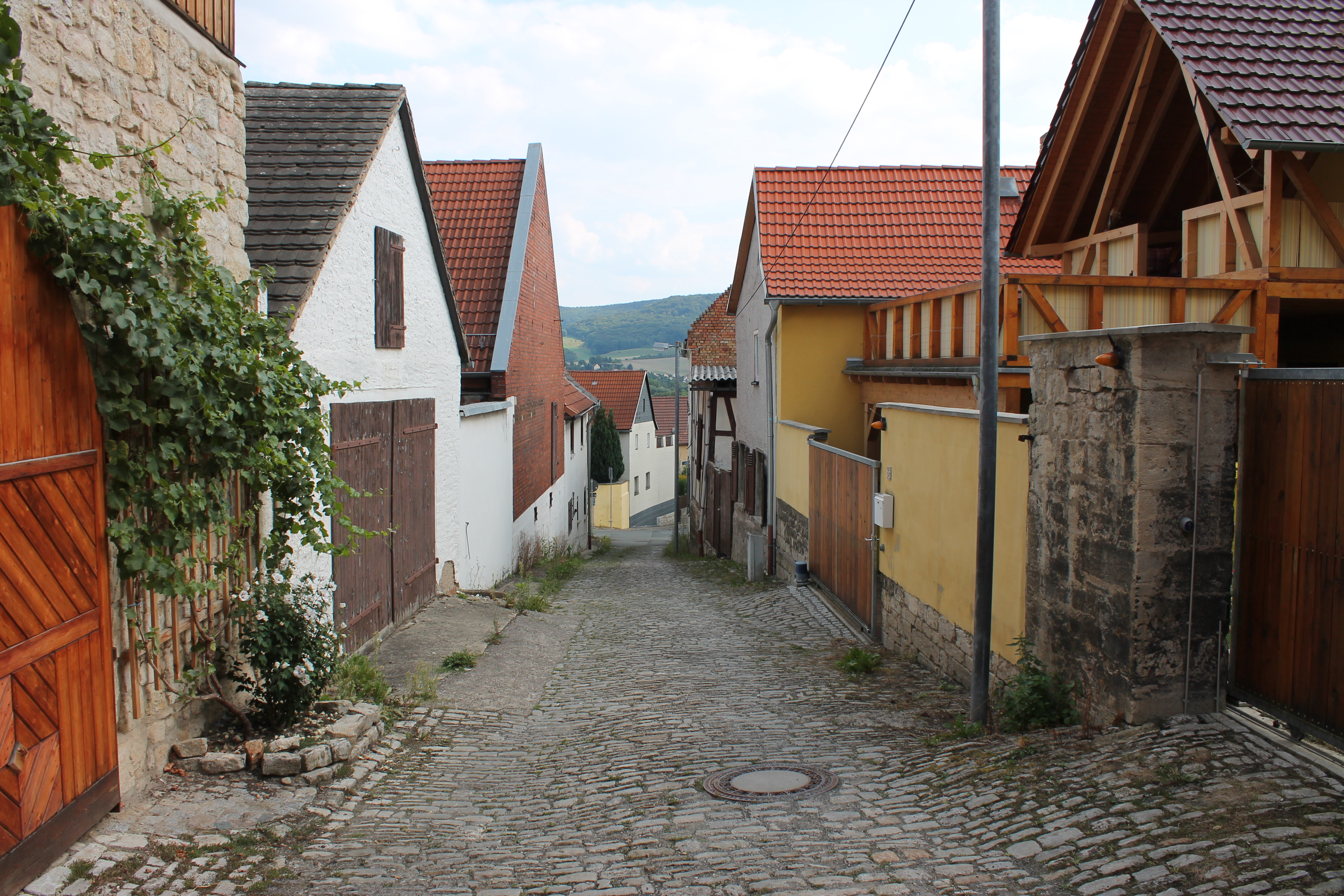
Zwätzen, Schulgasse

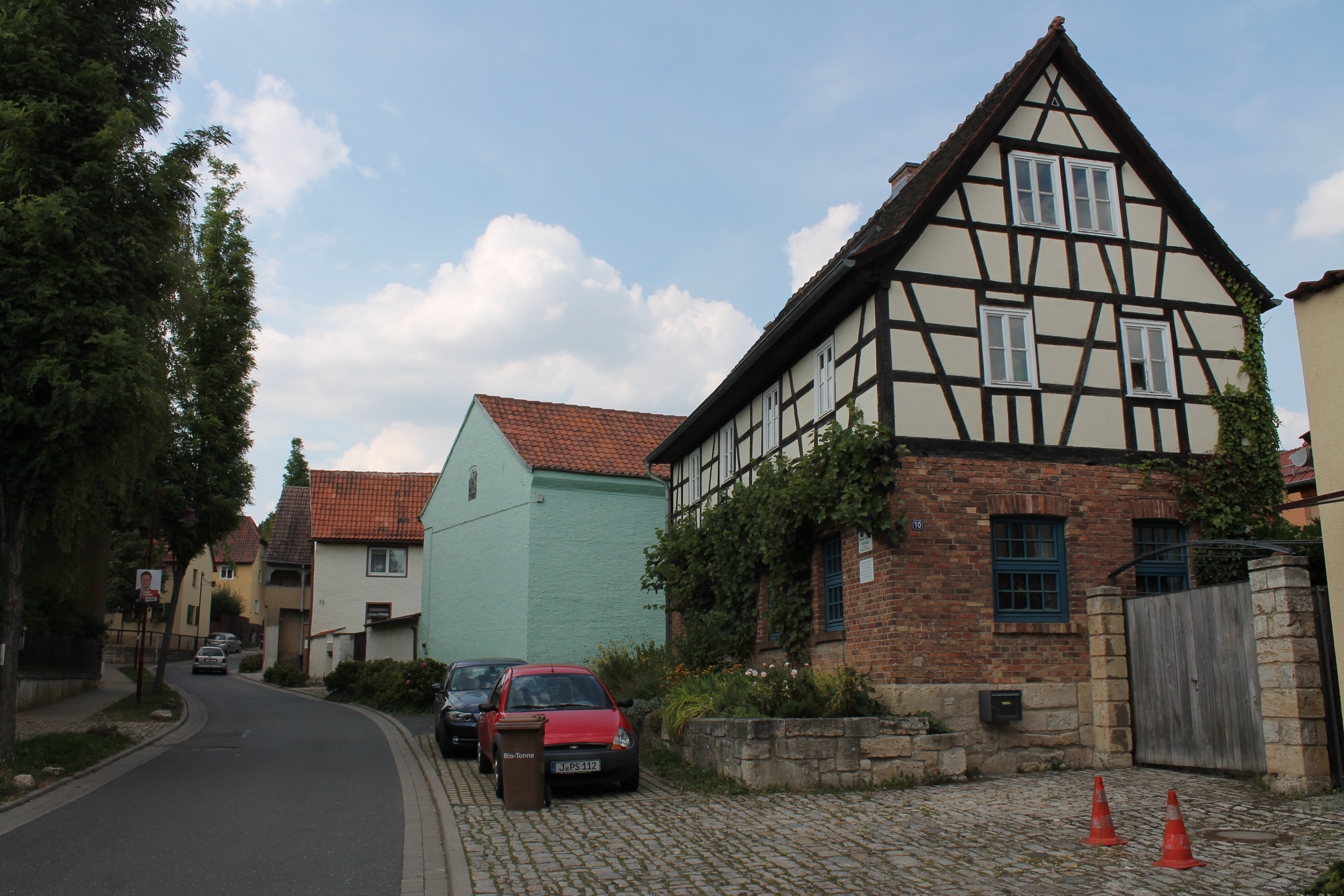
Zwätzen, Max-Gräfe street

Zwätzen is a district of the city of Jena in Thuringia, Germany. As a settlement Zwätzen was first mentioned in 1182 and was under the rule of Louis the Pious at that time.

== Geography ==
Zwätzen is located at the northern end of Jena, west of the Saale River. Above Zwätzen are the Heiligenberg and Jägerberg. The Jägerberg is home to a sheep farm (formerly a restaurant) and a former military area (formerly occupied by the Soviet Army, Border Troops of the GDR, and the National People's Army) that is planned to be recultivated.

== History ==
Zwätzen was first mentioned in a document on September 16, 1182, and was under the rule of Louis the Pious at that time. A member of the Teutonic Order, "Hugo, priest in Zwätzen," is mentioned in a document from 1221. The possessions of the Teutonic Order in Thuringia and the Vogtland region were administered from Zwätzen from approximately 1221 to 1809 (Ballei Thüringen). The last commander, Baron von Berlepsch, erected a memorial stone for 46 Saxons who fell in the Battle of Jena and Auerstedt on the estate towards Heiligenberg. Von Berlepsch died in Lehesten in 1809 and was buried in the St. Marien Church in Zwätzen. The church is notable for its wooden door from the 13th century, which is believed to be the oldest wooden church door in Central Germany.

Zwätzen was affected by witch persecution in 1600. A farmer was involved in a witch trial and was punished with banishment from the land.

The foundations for the development of agricultural facilities in Zwätzen were significantly established by the Teutonic Order. After the dissolution of the Landkomturei, the agricultural property became the Kammergut of the Grand Duchy of Saxe-Weimar and, from 1930, the teaching and experimental farm of Friedrich Schiller University of Jena. In 1826, Friedrich Gottlob Schulze founded the Agricultural Educational Institution in Jena, which was closely connected to the university and the estate in Zwätzen. The latter was successfully integrated into the state-owned VEG(Z) animal breeding in the GDR. On the premises of the agricultural school founded by Schulze in Zwätzen in 1856, there were, at the end of 1987, the Institute of Plant Nutrition and Ecotoxicology with the Department of Agrochemical Consultation and Analysis, as well as the branch of the Center for Soil Fertility Müncheberg. Both institutions were established under the LUFA-Thüringen as the Thuringian State Institute for Agriculture Jena after the reunification of Germany. In close proximity to the mentioned research facilities, the Institute for Bacterial Animal Disease Research and the District Institute for Veterinary Medicine were established in 1961 and 1964, respectively. The former institute is now the Federal Institute for Risk Assessment and Veterinary Medicine. The district institute was reorganized in Bad Langensalza.

Since 1991, the Thuringian State Institute for Agriculture has been managing the Agricultural Science Library Jena in Zwätzen. The library was created through the merger of the libraries of the Academy of Agricultural Sciences of the GDR and the Agricultural Branch of the ThULB, both located in Zwätzen until 1990. Part of the publicly accessible library is the professor's library of Friedrich Gottlob Schulze.

For centuries, the inhabitants of Zwätzen made a living from viticulture, agriculture, and craftsmanship, and later from work in Jena and at Jena University. In 1956, the Jena-Zwätzen Teaching and Experimental Farm became the first Haflinger horse breeding site in the GDR. Since 1980, wine has been cultivated again in Zwätzen, produced in the designated wine-growing area and known as "Jenaer Käuzchenberg," a quality wine. This hill is one of the few remaining vineyards in the city of Jena, which has a long tradition as a wine-growing region and features a grape cluster in its coat of arms. Other vineyards in Jena can be found at the Jenzig, in Wöllnitz, and in Kunitz.

More recent parts of Zwätzen include the "Siedlung am Heiligenberg" (1934/35) as well as residential areas such as "Himmelreich" and the commercial area "Saalepark" that have been developed in recent years.

In 1982, Zwätzen celebrated its 800th anniversary, and in 2007, the 825th anniversary was celebrated with a festive parade.

== Literature ==
Zwätzener Almanach ISBN 978-3-942115-08-7
