= Teutonic Order =

Medieval military order

Order of Brothers of the German House of Saint Mary in Jerusalem
- The coat of arms in the style of the 14th century
- Active: c. 1190 – present
- Allegiance: Holy See (c. 1190 – present); Austria (1945–present); Germany (1949–present); Czech Republic (1993–present) Historical: Holy Roman Empire (1190–1806); Kingdom of Jerusalem (1190–1291); Kingdom of Sicily (1191–1484); Kingdom of Cyprus (1197–1350); Kingdom of Bohemia (1198–1918); Republic of Venice (1209–1500); Kingdom of Hungary (1211–1225; 1429–1432; 1702–1731); State of the Teutonic Order (1226–1525); Terra Mariana & Livonian Confederation (1237–1561); Kingdom of Poland (1466–1525); Grand Duchy of Lithuania (1559–1561); Austrian Empire & Austria-Hungary (1804–1918); German Empire (1871–1918); Kingdom of Bavaria (1805–1809); Kingdom of Württemberg (1805–1809); Confederation of the Rhine (1806–1809); Grand Duchy of Baden (1806–1809); Grand Duchy of Hesse (1806–1809); Weimar Republic (1918–1933); Republic of German Austria & First Austrian Republic (1918–1934); (Czechoslovakia) First & Second Czechoslovak Republic (1918–1939); Federal State of Austria (1934–1938); Nazi Germany (1933–1945)
- Type: Catholic religious order (1198–1810 as military order)
- Headquarters: Acre (1190–1291); Venice (1291–1309); Marienburg (1309–1466); Königsberg (1466–1525); Mergentheim (1525–1809); Vienna (1809–present)
- Nicknames: Teutonic Knights, German Order
- Patron: Virgin Mary; Saint Elizabeth of Hungary; Saint George
- Attire: White mantle with a black cross
- Website: deutscher-orden.com

Commanders
- First Grand Master: Heinrich Walpot von Bassenheim
- Current Grand Master: Frank Bayard

The Teutonic Order is a Catholic religious institution founded as a military society c. 1198 in Acre, Kingdom of Jerusalem. The Order of Brothers of the German House of Saint Mary in Jerusalem was formed to aid Christians on their pilgrimages to the Holy Land and to establish hospitals. Its members have commonly been known as the Teutonic Knights, having historically served as a crusading military order for supporting Catholic rule in the Holy Land and the Northern Crusades during the Middle Ages, as well as supplying military protection for Catholics in Eastern Europe.

Purely religious since 1810, the Teutonic Order still confers limited honorary knighthoods. The Bailiwick of Utrecht of the Teutonic Order, a Protestant chivalric order, is descended from the same medieval military order and also continues to award knighthoods and perform charitable work.

== Name ==
The name of the Order of Brothers of the German House of Saint Mary in Jerusalem is in German: Orden der Brüder vom Deutschen Haus der Heiligen Maria in Jerusalem and in Latin Ordo domus Sanctae Mariae Theutonicorum Hierosolymitanorum. Thus the term "Teutonic" echoes the German origins of the order (Theutonicorum) in its Latin name. German-speakers commonly refer to the Deutscher Orden (official short name, literally "German Order"), historically also as Deutscher Ritterorden ("German Order of Knights"), Deutschherrenorden ("Order of the German Lords"), Deutschritterorden ("Order of the German Knights"), Marienritter ("Knights of Mary"), Die Herren im weißen Mantel ("The lords in white capes"), etc..

The Teutonic Knights have been known as Zakon Krzyżacki in Polish ("Order of the Cross") and as Kryžiuočių Ordinas in Lithuanian, Vācu Ordenis in Latvian, Saksa Ordu or, simply, Ordu ("The Order") in Estonian.

== History ==
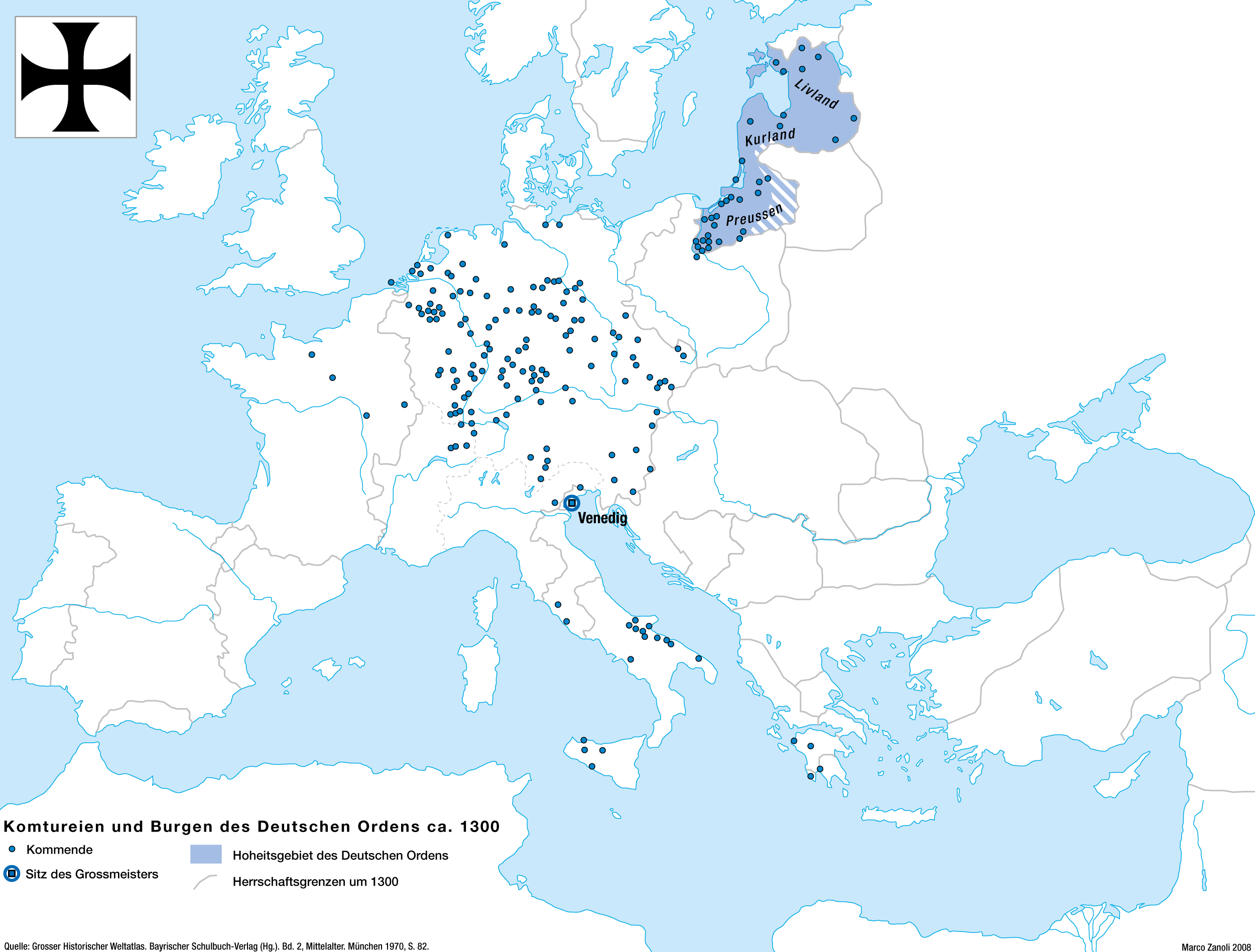
Extent of the Teutonic Order in 1300

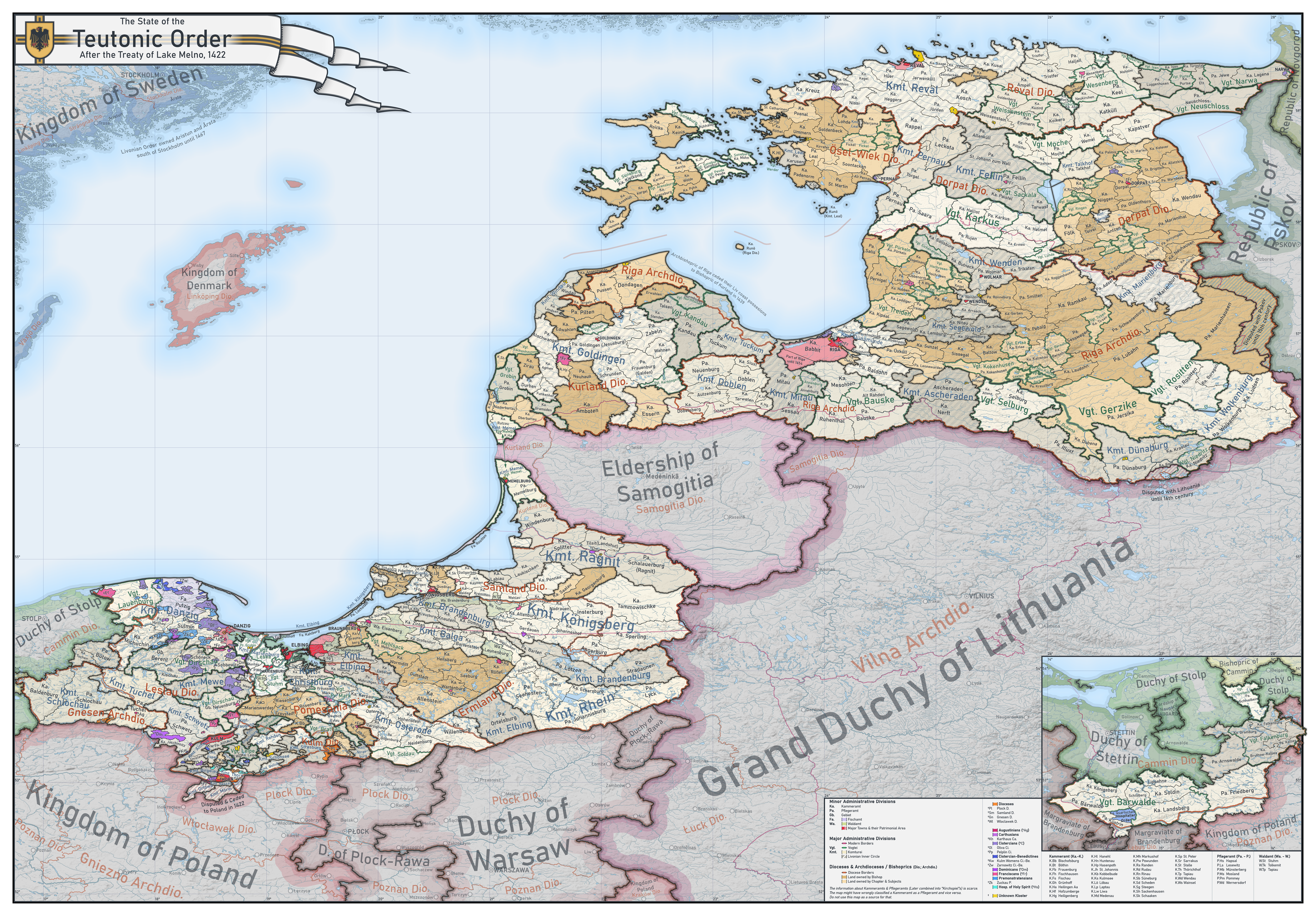
Teutonic and Livonian Orders in 1422

The fraternity which preceded the formation of the Order was founded around 1190 in Acre by German merchants from Bremen and Lübeck during the siege of Acre, as part of the Third Crusade to the Holy Land. In 1191, they took over a hospital in the city in order to take care of the sick and began to describe themselves as the Hospital of St. Mary of the German House in Jerusalem. Pope Clement III approved it and the Order started to play an important role in Outremer (the general name for the Crusader states), controlling the port tolls of Acre. In 1211, during the second, much weaker Crusader kingdom in the Holy Land, but still long before its final demise in 1291, the Order was "invited" to the Burzenland (southeastern Transylvania) to help defend the southeastern borders of the Kingdom of Hungary against the Cumans. The Order asked German planters to help build up settlements to provide support. As the Order pushed back the invaders, the settlements expanded. King Andrew II of Hungary became concerned he was losing influence. So, in 1225, after Pope Honorius III's papal bull claiming his authority over the Order's territory in Transylvania and its tax exemption toward the king, Andrew expelled the Order.

The Order's next assignment concerned Konrad I of Masovia, who was settling a frontier around Prussia, a region named for the Old Prussians who lived there. Konrad was unable to stop the Prussian raids and the Dobrzyń knights he had gathered for this purpose were defeated, in 1228. So, in coordination with the Holy Roman Empire and Konrad, the Grand Master Hermann von Salza and his Teutonic Order arrived in the region, in 1230. Along with Konrad's forces, the Order pushed back the Prussian tribes and began to push further to conquer and Christianize them.

Through the Golden Bull of Rimini and Treaty of Kruszwica, the Order asserted its claims to the territory that was now secure, the Chełmno Land (also: Ziemia Chełmińska or Kulmerland). From this, the Order created the independent State of the Teutonic Order, to which conquered territory was continuously added. Through the incorporation of the Livonian Brothers of the Sword and further crusading, the added territory included Livonia. Over time, certain kings and dukes of Poland would challenge the Order's land claims, specifically Chełmno Land and, later, Pomerelia (also Pomorze Gdańskie or Vistula Pomerania), Kuyavia, and Dobrzyń Land.The Teutonic Knights in Gargano, particularly between the 13th and 15th centuries, had their main center in San Leonardo di Siponto (Manfredonia), transforming it into a powerful preceptory for the reception of pilgrims and crusaders heading to the Holy Land and the sanctuary of Saint Michael in Monte Sant'Angelo. They governed these lands for centuries, building hospices, churches, and defensive structures.

Following the Christianization of Lithuania, the Order State was no longer crusading. It was instead recruiting planters from the Holy Roman Empire and a fighting force to augment feudal levies. There were also wars against the Kingdom of Poland, the Grand Duchy of Lithuania, and the Novgorod Republic. Through its control of port cities and trade, specifically with the Hanseatic League, the Order State built up its economic base. The Order State also built ships and had a naval presence in the Baltic Sea. In 1410, a Polish-Lithuanian army decisively defeated the Order State and broke its military power at the Battle of Grunwald. However, the Order State successfully defended its capital in the following Siege of Marienburg (Malbork) and was saved from collapse.

In 1515, Holy Roman Emperor Maximilian I made a marriage alliance with Sigismund I of Poland-Lithuania. Thereafter, the empire did not support the Order against Poland. In 1525, Grand Master Albert of Brandenburg resigned and converted to Lutheranism, becoming Duke of Prussia as a vassal of Poland. Soon after, the Order lost Livonia and its holdings in the Protestant areas of Germany. The Order did keep its considerable holdings in Catholic areas of Germany until 1809, when Napoleon Bonaparte ordered its dissolution and the Order lost its last secular holdings.

However, the Order continued to exist as a charitable and ceremonial body. It was outlawed by Nazi Germany in 1938, but re-established in 1945. Today it operates primarily with charitable aims in Central Europe.

The Knights wore white surcoats with a black cross. A cross pattée was sometimes used as their coat of arms; this emblem was later used for military decoration and insignia by the Kingdom of Prussia and Germany as the Iron Cross. The motto of the Order was: "Helfen, Wehren, Heilen" ("Help, Defend, Heal").

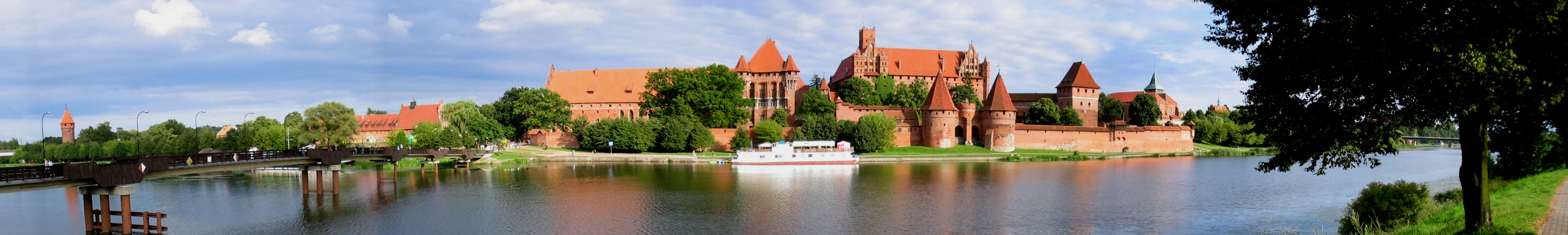
The Order's Marienburg Castle, Monastic state of the Teutonic Knights, now Malbork, Poland

=== Foundation 1143–1192 ===
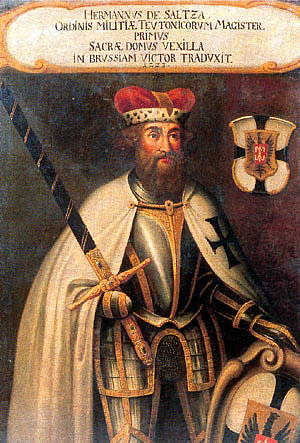
Hermann von Salza, the fourth Grand Master of the Teutonic Knights (1209–1239)

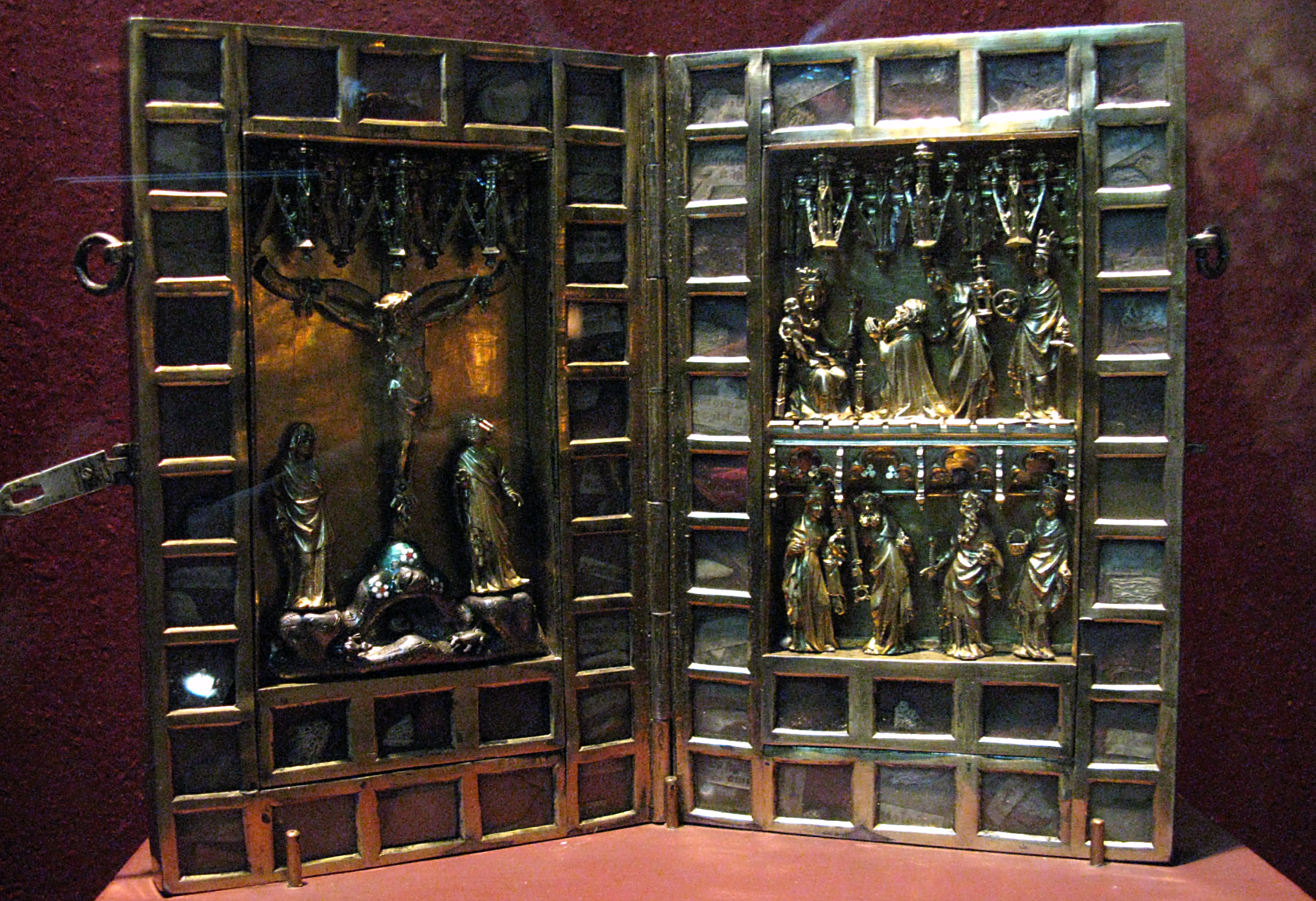
Reliquary made in Elbing in 1388 for Teutonic komtur Thiele von Lorich, military trophy of Polish king Wladislaus in 1410

In 1143, Pope Celestine II ordered the Knights Hospitaller to take over management of a German hospital in Jerusalem, which, according to the chronicler Jean d'Ypres, accommodated the countless German pilgrims and crusaders who could neither speak the local language nor Latin (patriæ linguam ignorantibus atque Latinam). Although formally an institution of the Hospitallers, the pope commanded that the prior and the brothers of the domus Theutonicorum (house of the Germans) should always be Germans themselves, so a tradition of a German-led religious institution could develop during the 12th century in the Kingdom of Jerusalem.

After the loss of Jerusalem in 1187, some merchants from Lübeck and Bremen took up the idea and founded a field hospital for the duration of the Siege of Acre in 1190, which became the nucleus of the order; Pope Celestine III recognized it in 1192 by granting the monks Augustinian Rule. However, based on the model of the Knights Templar, it was transformed into a military order in 1198 and the head of the order became known as the Grand Master (magister hospitalis). It received papal orders for crusades to take and hold Jerusalem for Christianity and defend the Holy Land against the Muslim Saracens. During the rule of Grand Master Hermann von Salza (1209–1239) the Order changed from being a hospice brotherhood for pilgrims to primarily a military order.

The Order was founded in Acre, and the Knights purchased Montfort Castle, northeast of Acre, in 1220. This castle, which defended the route between Jerusalem and the Mediterranean Sea, was made the seat of the Grand Masters in 1229, although they returned to Acre after losing Montfort to Muslim control in 1271. The Order received donations of land in the Holy Roman Empire (especially in present-day Germany and Italy), Frankokratia, and the Kingdom of Jerusalem.

Frederick II, Holy Roman Emperor, elevated his close friend Hermann von Salza to the status of Reichsfürst, or "Prince of the Empire", enabling the Grand Master to negotiate with other senior princes as an equal. During Frederick's coronation as King of Jerusalem in 1225, Teutonic Knights served as his escort in the Church of the Holy Sepulchre; von Salza read the emperor's proclamation in both French and German. However, the Teutonic Knights were never as influential in Outremer as the older Knights Templar and Knights Hospitaller.

Teutonic Order domains in 13th century Levant were as follows

- In the Kingdom of Jerusalem:
  - Montfort Castle (Starkenberg), 1220–1271; inland from Nahariya in Northern Israel
  - Mi'ilya (Castellum Regis), 1220–1271; near Montfort
  - Khirbat Jiddin (Judin), 1220–1271; near Montfort
  - Cafarlet, 1255–1291; south of Haifa
  - the Lordship of Toron and Lordship of Joscelin in Northern Israel and Southern Lebanon, both owned by the Teutonic Knights 1220–1229 but under Muslim rule during that period. The Knights retained Maron, a vassal of Toron, after 1229, and in 1261 acquired another Toron-Ahmud, another vassal lordship. They also leased (1256) and bought (1261) the stronghold of Achziv (Casale Umberti, Arabic Az-Zīb) on the coast north of Nahariya.
  - the Lordship of the Schuf, an offshoot of the Lordship of Sidon, 1256–1268; inland from modern Saida in Lebanon
- In the Armenian Kingdom of Cilicia:
  - Amouda, 1212–1266; near modern Osmaniye, Turkey
  - Düziçi (Aronia), 1236–1270s; near Amouda

=== Transylvania, Kingdom of Hungary, 1211 onward ===
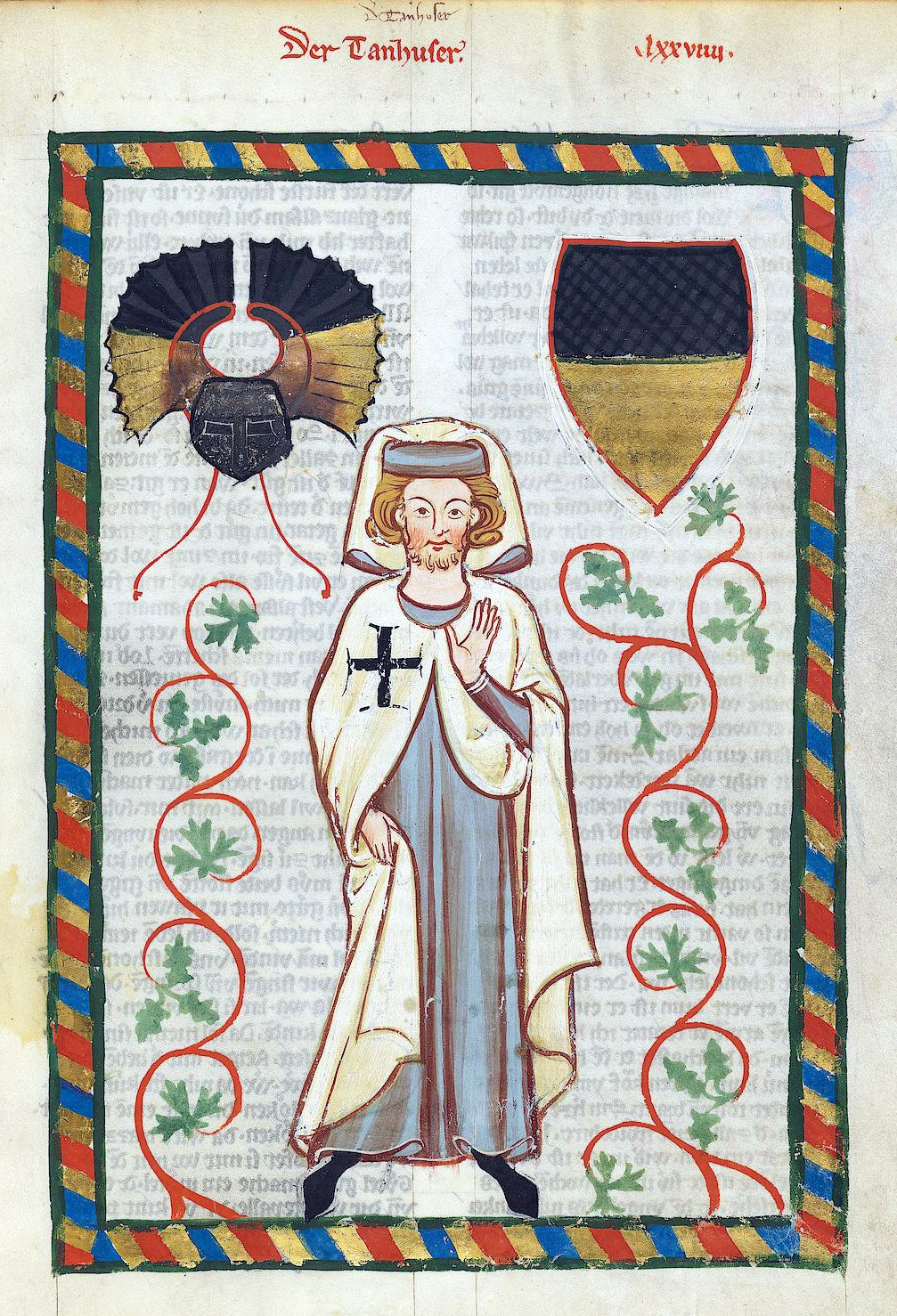
Tannhäuser in the habit of the Teutonic Knights, from the Codex Manesse

In 1211, Andrew II of Hungary accepted the services of the Teutonic Knights and granted them the district of Burzenland in Transylvania, where they would be exempt from fees and duties and could administer their own justice. Andrew had been involved in negotiations for the marriage of his daughter with the son of Hermann, Landgrave of Thuringia, whose vassals included the family of Hermann von Salza. Led by a brother called Theoderich or Dietrich, the Order defended the south-eastern borders of the Kingdom of Hungary against the neighbouring Cumans. Many forts of wood and mud were built for defence. They settled new German peasants among the existing Transylvanian Saxon inhabitants. The Cumans had no fixed settlements for resistance, and soon the Teutons were expanding into their territory. By 1220, the Teutonics Knights had built five castles, some of them made of stone. Their rapid expansion made the Hungarian nobility and clergy, who were previously uninterested in those regions, jealous and suspicious. Some nobles claimed these lands, but the Order refused to share them, ignoring the demands of the local bishop.

After the Fifth Crusade, King Andrew returned to Hungary and found his kingdom full of resentment because of the expenses and losses of the failed military campaign. When the nobles demanded that he cancel the concessions made to the Knights, he concluded that they had exceeded their task and that the agreement should be revised, but did not revert the concessions. However, Prince Béla, heir to the throne, was allied with the nobility. In 1224, the Teutonic Knights, seeing that they would have problems when the Prince inherited the Kingdom, petitioned Pope Honorius III to be placed directly under the authority of the Papal See, rather than that of the King of Hungary. This was a grave mistake, as King Andrew, angered and alarmed at their growing power, responded in 1225 by expelling the Teutonic Knights, although he allowed the ethnically German commoners and peasants settled here by the Order to remain and these became part of the larger group of the Transylvanian Saxons. Lacking the military organization and experience of the Teutonic Knights, the Hungarians failed to replace them with adequate defence against the attacking Cumans. Soon, the steppe warriors would be a threat again.

=== Prussia, 13th century ===
In 1226, Konrad I, Duke of Masovia in north-eastern Poland, appealed to the Knights to defend his borders and subdue the pagan Baltic Old Prussians, allowing the Teutonic Knights use of Chełmno Land as a base for their campaign. This being a time of widespread crusading fervor throughout Western Europe, Hermann von Salza considered Prussia a good training ground for his knights for the wars against the Muslims in Outremer. With the Golden Bull of Rimini, Emperor Frederick II bestowed on the Order a special imperial privilege for the conquest and possession of Prussia, including Chełmno Land, with nominal papal sovereignty. In 1235 the Teutonic Knights assimilated the smaller Order of Dobrzyń, which had been established earlier by Christian, the first Bishop of Prussia.

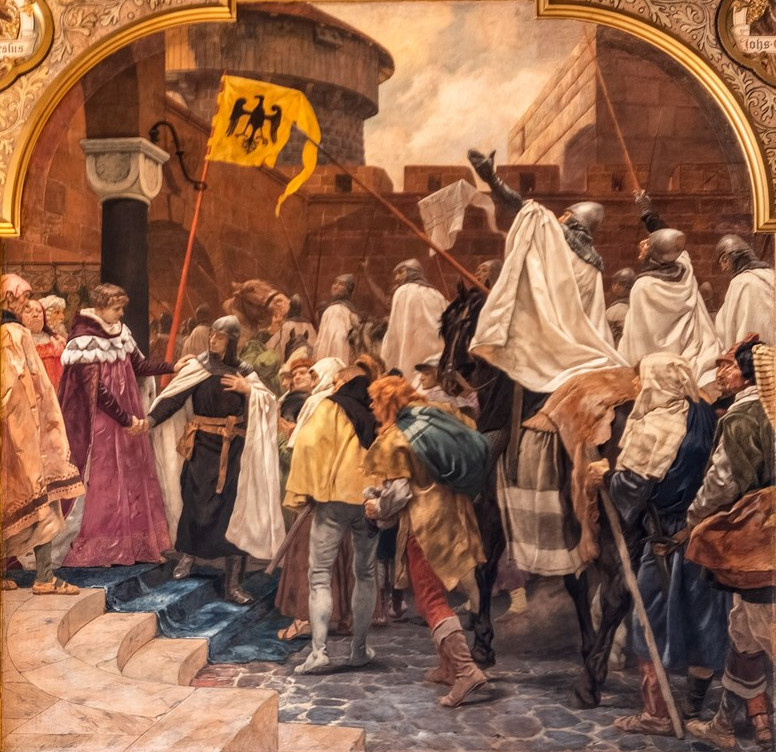
Frederick II allows the order to invade Prussia, by P. Janssen

The conquest of Prussia was accomplished with much bloodshed over more than fifty years, during which native Prussians who remained unbaptised were subjugated, killed, or exiled. Fighting between the Knights and the Prussians was ferocious; chronicles of the Order state the Prussians would "roast captured brethren alive in their armour, like chestnuts, before the shrine of a local god". Their population was already in decline due to the Ostsiedlung. German peasants, artisans, and merchant settlers were predominantly concentrated in the southern part of the Teutonic State and did not move into the lands of Nadruva, Skalva, and the southern Curonian mountains until the 18th century, due to invasions by the army of the Grand Duchy of Lithuania. The Prussians had become completely Germanized by the early to mid-18th century.

The native nobility who submitted to the crusaders had many of their privileges confirmed by the Treaty of Christburg. After the Prussian uprisings of 1260–83, however, much of the Prussian nobility emigrated or were resettled, and many free Prussians lost their rights. The Prussian nobles who remained were more closely allied with the German landowners and were gradually assimilated. Peasants in frontier regions, such as Samland, had more privileges than those in more populated lands, such as Pomesania. The crusading knights often accepted baptism as a form of submission by the natives. Christianity along western lines slowly spread through Prussian culture. Bishops were reluctant to have pagan Prussian religious practices integrated into the new faith, while the ruling knights found it easier to govern the natives when they were semi-pagan and lawless. After fifty years of warfare and brutal conquest, the end result was that most of the Prussian natives were either killed or deported.

The conquest of the Sambians during the Prussian Crusade was delayed by the First Prussian Uprising which broke out in 1242. The uprising technically ended in 1249 with the signing of the Treaty of Christburg, but skirmishes continued for four more years. Only in 1254–1255 were the knights able to mount a major campaign against the Sambians. King Ottokar II of Bohemia took part in the expedition and as a tribute the knights named the newly founded Königsberg Castle after him. The Sambians rose up against the knights during the Great Prussian Uprising (1260–1274), but were the first to surrender. When other clans attempted to revive the uprising in 1276, Theodoric, vogt of Sambia, persuaded the Sambians not to join the insurrection; the Natangians and Warmians followed the Sambian example, and the uprising was crushed within a year. In 1243, the Bishopric of Samlandia (Sambia) was established as the ecclesiastical administration of the region, as directed by the papal legate William of Modena. By the end of the 13th century, there were only 22,000 Sambians.

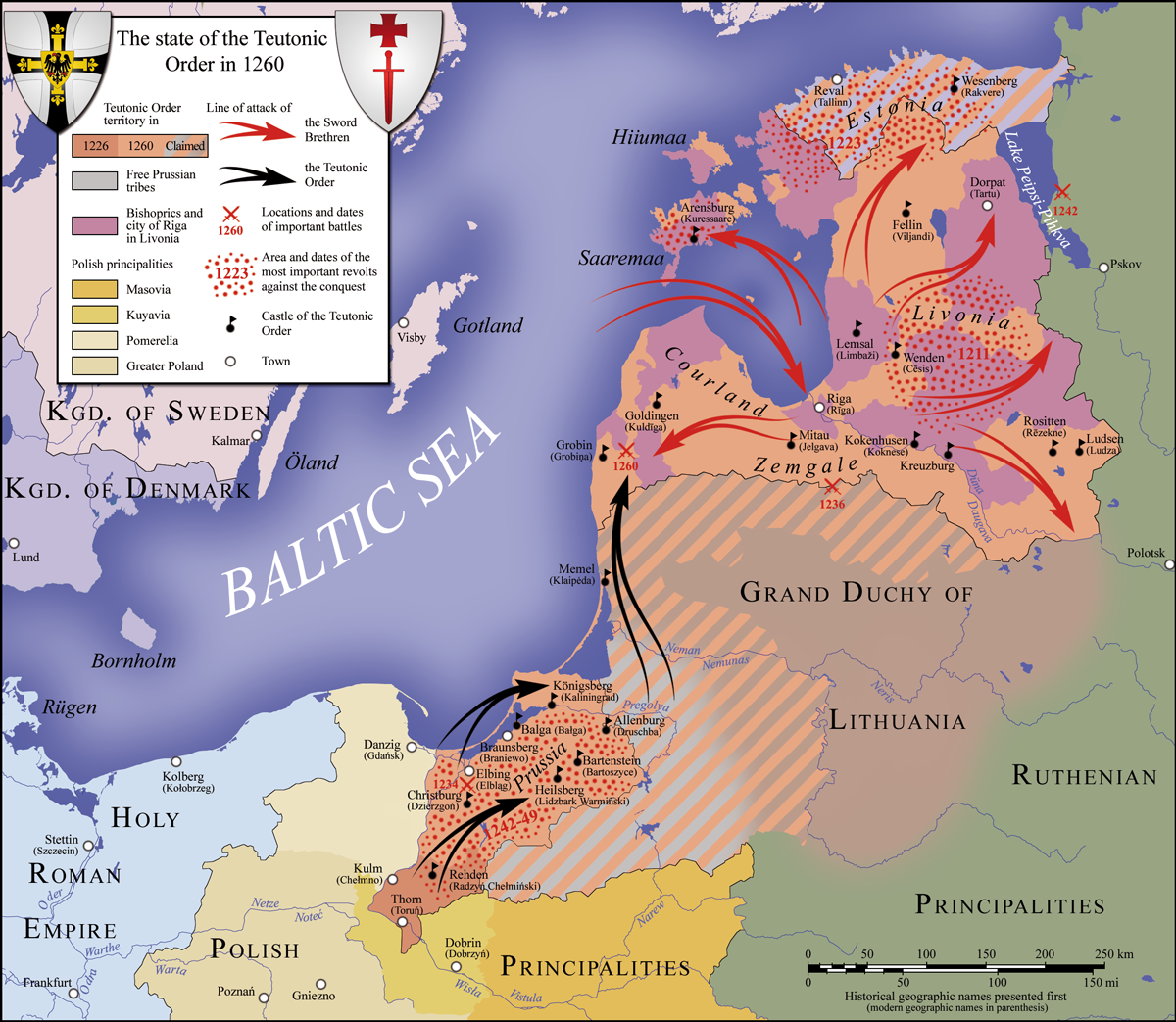
Map of the Teutonic state in 1260

The Order ruled Prussia under charters issued by the Pope and the Holy Roman Emperor as a sovereign monastic state, comparable to the arrangement of the Knights Hospitallers in Rhodes and later in Malta.

To make up for losses from the plague and to replace the partially exterminated native population, the Order encouraged immigration from the Holy Roman Empire (mostly Germans, Flemish, and Dutch) and from Masovia (Poles), the later Masurians. These included nobles, burghers, and peasants, and the surviving Old Prussians were gradually assimilated through Germanization. The settlers founded numerous towns and cities on former Prussian settlements. The Order itself built a number of castles (Ordensburgen) from which it could defeat uprisings of Old Prussians, as well as continue its attacks on the Grand Duchy of Lithuania and the Kingdom of Poland, with which the Order was often at war during the 14th and 15th centuries. Major towns founded by the Order included Thorn (Toruń), Kulm (Chełmno), Allenstein (Olsztyn), Elbing (Elbląg), Memel (Klaipėda), and Königsberg, founded in 1255 in honor of King Otakar II of Bohemia on the site of a destroyed Prussian settlement.

=== Livonia, 1237 until 1346 purchase ===
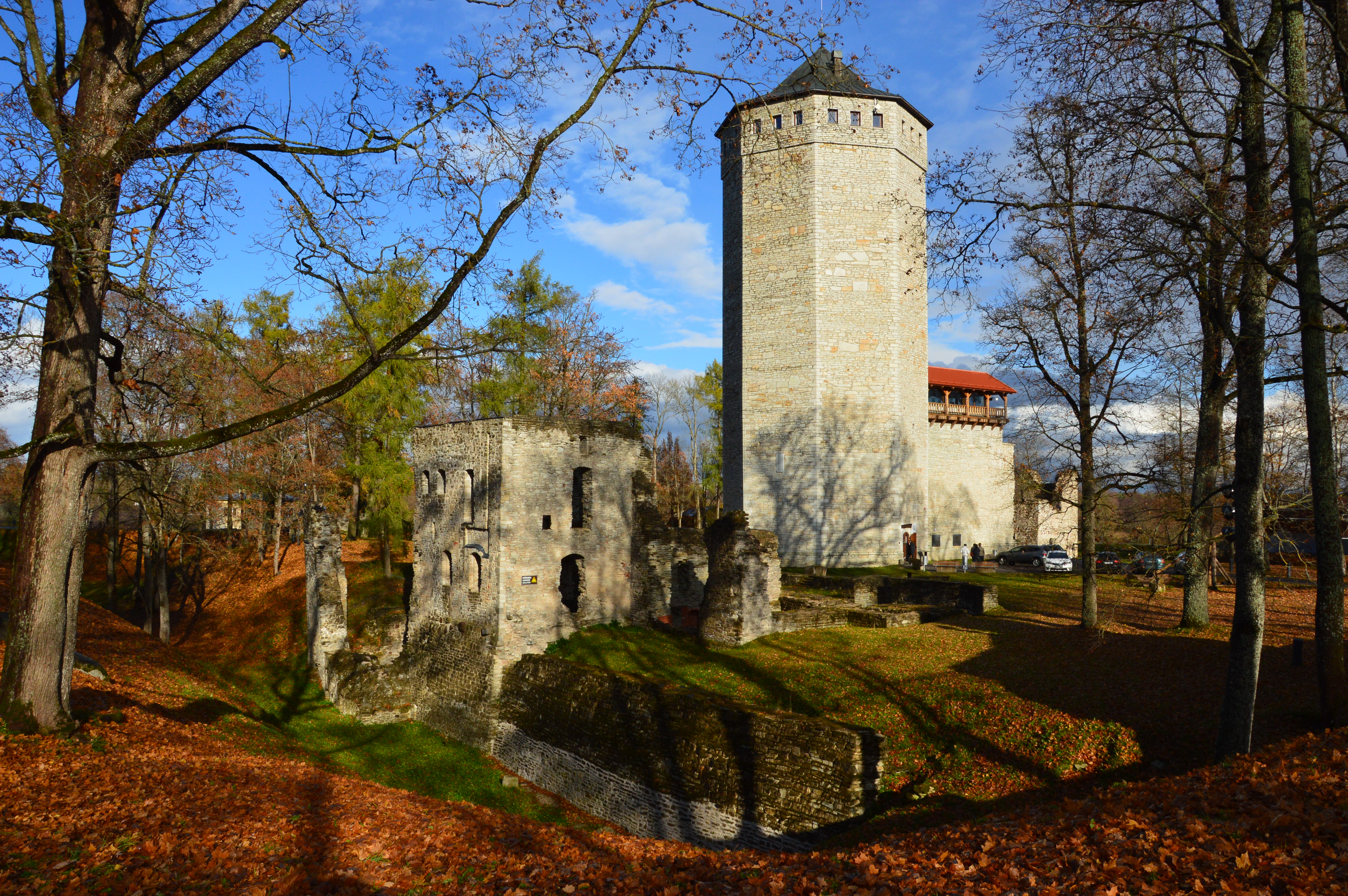
Ruins of the Teutonic Order's castle in Paide, Estonia

After suffering a devastating defeat in the Battle of Saule, the Livonian Brothers of the Sword were absorbed by the Teutonic Knights in 1237. The Livonian branch subsequently became known as the Livonian Order.

Although the Northern Crusades were aimed at pagan Balts and Finns, rather than Orthodox Russians, several unsuccessful attempts were made to persuade Novgorod to convert to Catholicism after the capture of Tartu. Livonian missionary and Crusade activity in Estonia caused conflicts with Novgorod, which had also attempted to subjugate, raid and convert the pagan Estonians. Hoping to exploit Novgorod's weakness in the wake of the Mongol and Swedish invasions, the Teutonic Knights penetrated deep into Novgorodian territory; however, in 1242, they were defeated in the Battle on the Ice at the hands of Prince Alexander Nevsky. The Livonian Rhymed Chronicle describes the events:

There is a city in Russia called Novgorod, and when its king [Alexandre] heard what had happened he marched towards Pskov with many troops. He arrived there with a mighty force of many Russians to free the Pskovians and these latter heartily rejoiced. When he saw the Germans he did not hesitate long. They drove away the two Brothers, removed them from their governorship and routed their troops. The Germans fled and allowed the land to revert to the Russians. Thus it went for the Teutonic Knights, but if Pskov had been protected it would have benefited Christianity until the end of the world. It is a mistake to take a fair land and fail to occupy it properly. It is deplorable, for the result is sure to be disastrous. The king of Novgorod then returned home.

— Livonian Rhymed Chronicle

Over the next decades the Order focused on the subjugation of the Curonians and Semigallians. In 1260 it suffered a disastrous defeat in the Battle of Durbe against Samogitians, and this inspired rebellions throughout Prussia and Livonia. After the Knights won a crucial victory in the Siege of Königsberg from 1262 to 1265, the war had reached a turning point. The Curonians were finally subjugated in 1267 and the Semigallians in 1290. The Order suppressed a major Estonian rebellion in 1343–1345, and in 1346 purchased the Duchy of Estonia from Denmark.

=== Against Lithuania, 1291–1500 ===
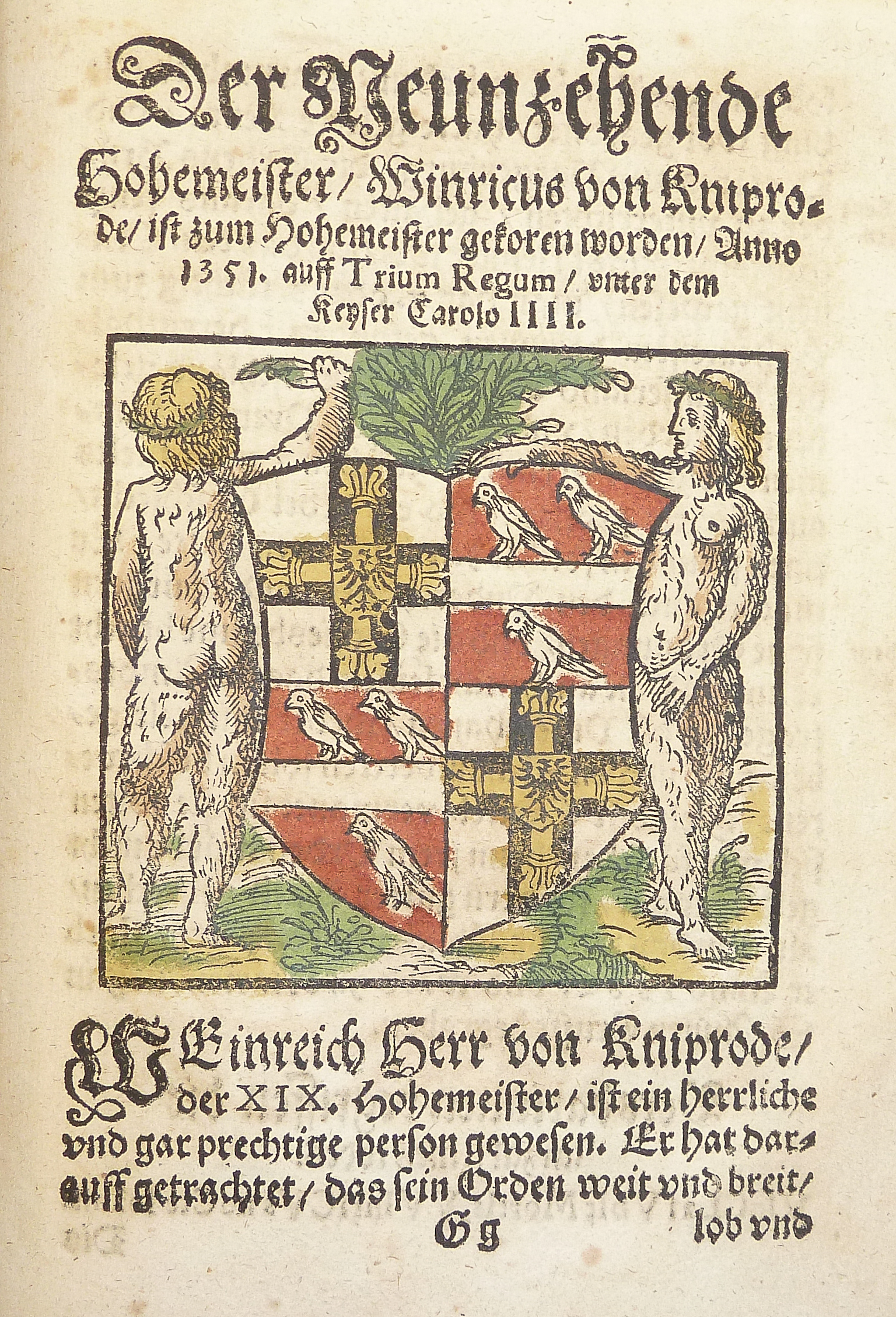
Coat of arms of Winrich von Kniprode, who led the Teutonic Order to victory at the Battle of Strėva

The Teutonic Knights began to direct their campaigns against the pagan Grand Duchy of Lithuania (see Lithuanian mythology), due to the long existing conflicts in the region (including constant incursions into the Holy Roman Empire's territory by pagan raiding parties) and the lack of a proper area of operation for the Knights, after the fall of the Kingdom of Jerusalem at Acre in 1291 and their later expulsion from Hungary. At first the knights moved their headquarters to Venice, from which they planned the recovery of Outremer; this plan was, however, soon abandoned, and the Order later moved its headquarters to Marienburg, so it could better focus its efforts on the region of Prussia. Because "Lithuania Propria" remained non-Christian until the end of the 14th century, much later than the rest of eastern Europe, the conflicts were dragged out over a longer time, and many Knights from western European countries, such as England and France, journeyed to Prussia to participate in the seasonal campaigns (reyse) against the Grand Duchy of Lithuania. In 1348, the Order won a great victory over the Lithuanians in the Battle of Strėva, severely weakening them. In 1370 it won a decisive victory over Lithuania in the Battle of Rudau.

Warfare between the Order and the Lithuanians was particularly brutal. It was common practice for Lithuanians to torture captured enemies and civilians. It is recorded by a Teutonic chronicler that they had the habit of tying captured knights to their horses and having both of them burned alive, while sometimes a stake would be driven into their bodies or the knight would be flayed. Lithuanian pagan customs included ritualistic human sacrifice, the hanging of widows, and the burying of a warrior's horses and servants with him after his death. The knights would also, on occasion, take captives from defeated Lithuanians, whose condition (as that of other war captives in the Middle Ages) was extensively researched by Jacques Heers. The conflict had much influence in the political situation of the region and was the source of many rivalries between Lithuanians or Poles and Germans; the degree to which it impacted the mentalities of the time can be seen in the lyrical works of men such as the contemporary Austrian poet Peter Suchenwirt.

Overall, the conflict lasted over 200 years (although with varying degrees of active hostility during that time), its front line extending along both banks of the Neman River, with as many as twenty forts and castles between Seredžius and Jurbarkas alone.

=== Battle of Legnica, 1241 ===
In 1236, the Knights of Saint Thomas, an English order, adopted the rules of the Teutonic Order. A contingent of Teutonic Knights of indeterminate number is traditionally believed to have participated at the Battle of Legnica in 1241 during the first Mongol invasion of Poland. The combined Polish-German army was crushed by the Mongol army and their superior tactics, with few survivors.

=== Against Poland, 1308–1343 ===
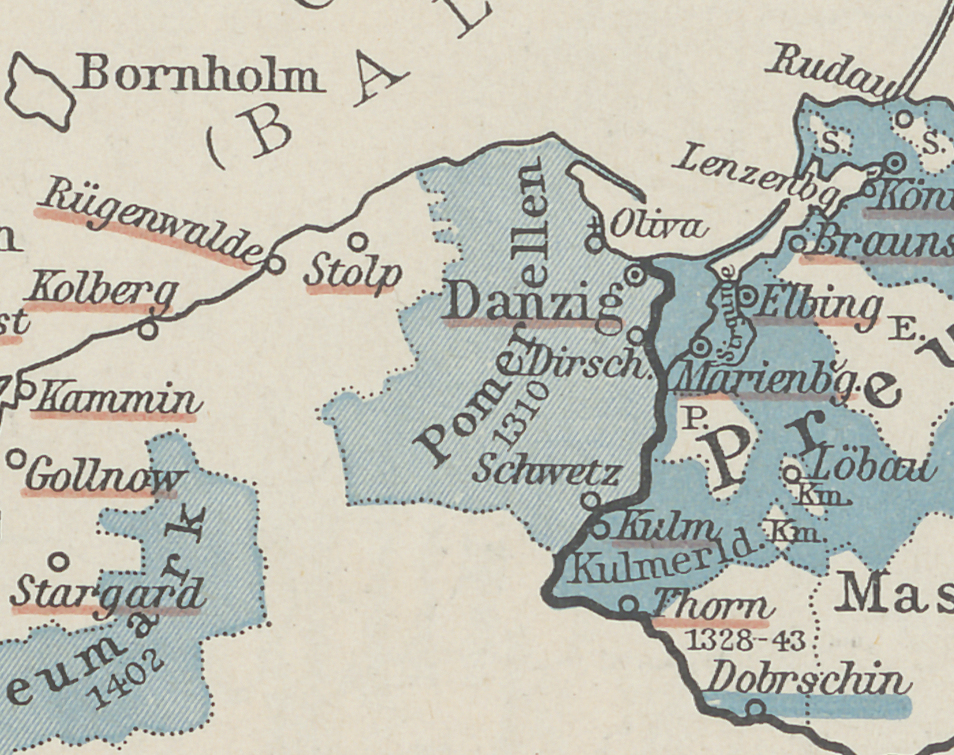
Pomerelia (Pommerellen) while part of the monastic state of the Teutonic Knights

A dispute over the claims to Pomerelia embroiled the Order in further conflict at the beginning of the 14th century. Duke Władysław I the Elbow-high of Poland wanted the region, citing inheritance from Przemysł II. He was opposed by some Pomeranian nobles, but also a Danish prince, who supported the Margrave of Brandenburg's claim that the region had been granted to Brandenburg as a fief by King Wenceslaus. Forces from Denmark and Brandenburg had tried and failed to take the site in 1301 and 1306 but, in the summer of 1308, Brandenburg's forces tried again, targeting the present-day site of Gdańsk, where a rebellion had erupted in their favor. Władysław pressed the Teutonic Order for help and the Teutonic Knights, led by Grand Master Siegfried von Feuchtwangen, drove Brandenburg out. The Knights requested payment in exchange and Władysław refused.

By November, the Order forces under a Prussian Landmeister Heinrich von Plötzke took the site for themselves. According to some sources, they massacred the town's inhabitants, although the exact extent of the violence is unknown and widely recognized by historians to be an unsolvable mystery. The estimates range from 60 rebellious leaders, reported by dignitaries of the region and Knight chroniclers, to 10,000 civilians, a number cited in a papal bull (of dubious provenance) that was used in a legal process installed to punish the Order for the event; the legal dispute went on for a time, but the Order was eventually absolved of the charges. In the Treaty of Soldin, the Teutonic Order purchased the castles of Gdańsk, Świecie, and Tczew and their hinterlands from the margraves for 10,000 marks on 13 September 1309.

Control of Pomerelia allowed the Order to connect their monastic state with the borders of the Holy Roman Empire. Crusading reinforcements and supplies could travel from the Imperial territory of Hither Pomerania through Pomerelia to Prussia, while Poland's access to the Baltic Sea was blocked. While Poland had mostly been an ally of the knights against the pagan Prussians and Lithuanians, the capture of Pomerelia turned the kingdom into a determined enemy of the Order.

The capture of Gdańsk marked a new phase in the history of the Teutonic Knights. The persecution and abolition of the powerful Knights Templar, which began in 1307, worried the Teutonic Knights, but control of Pomerelia allowed them to move their headquarters in 1309 from Venice to Marienburg (Malbork) on the Nogat River, outside the reach of secular powers. The position of Prussian Landmeister was merged with that of the Grand Master. The Pope began investigating misconduct by the knights, but no charges were found to have substance. Along with the campaigns against the Lithuanians, the knights faced a vengeful Poland and legal threats from the Papacy.

The Treaty of Kalisz of 1343 ended the open war between the Teutonic Knights and Poland. The Knights relinquished Kuyavia and Dobrzyń Land to Poland, but retained Chełmno Land and Pomerelia with Gdańsk (Germanized as Danzig).

=== Height of power, 1337–1407 ===
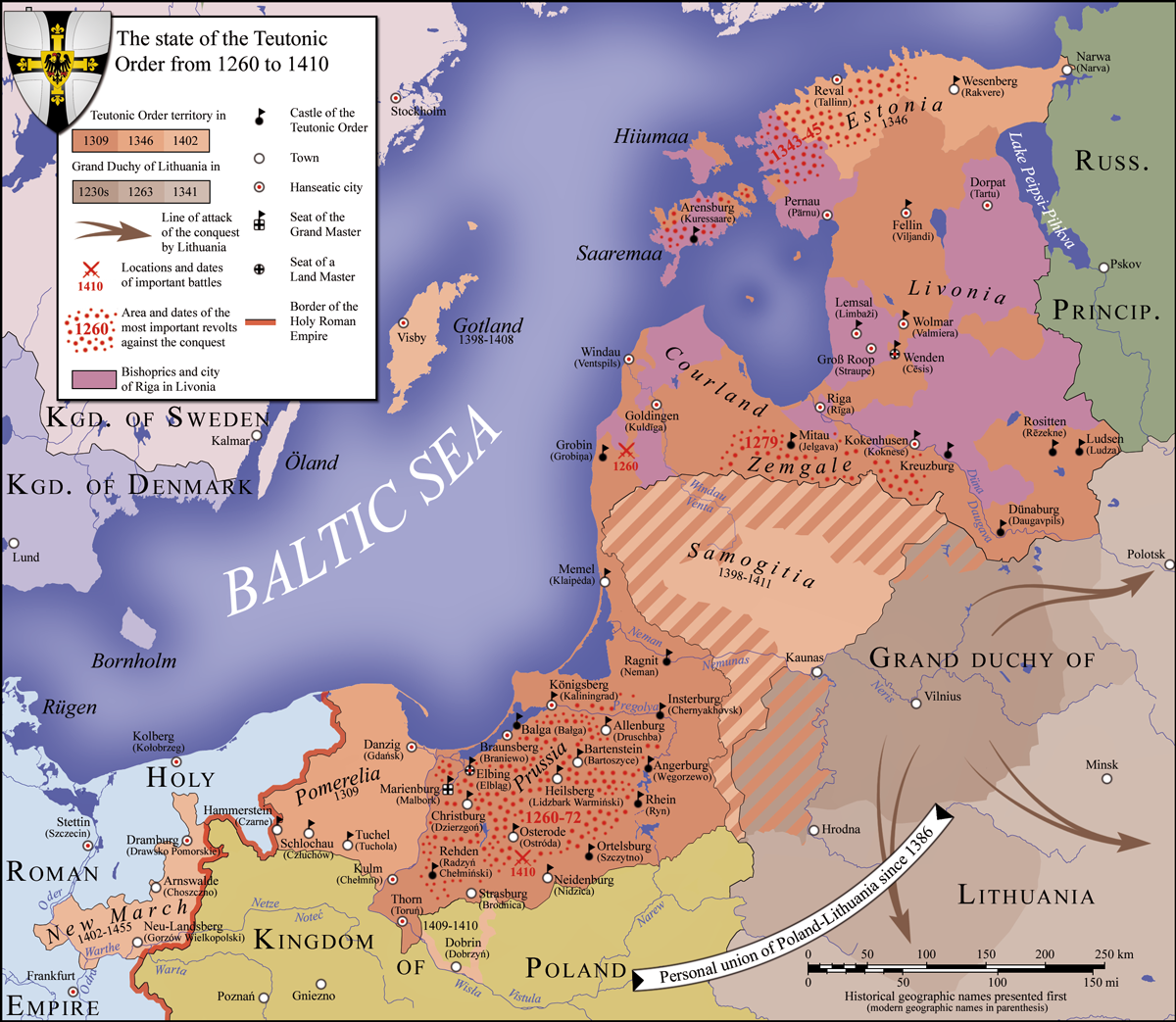
Map of the Teutonic state in 1410

In 1337, Emperor Louis IV allegedly granted the Order the imperial privilege to conquer all Lithuania and Russia. During the reign of Grand Master Winrich von Kniprode (1351–1382), the Order reached the peak of its international prestige and hosted numerous European crusaders and nobility.

King Albert of Sweden ceded Gotland to the Order as a pledge (similar to a fiefdom), with the understanding that they would eliminate the pirating Victual Brothers from this strategic island base in the Baltic Sea. An invasion force under Grand Master Konrad von Jungingen conquered the island in 1398 and drove the Victual Brothers out of Gotland and the Baltic Sea.

In 1386, Grand Duke Jogaila of Lithuania was baptised into Christianity and married Queen Jadwiga of Poland, taking the name Władysław II Jagiełło and becoming King of Poland. This created a personal union between the two countries and a potentially formidable opponent for the Teutonic Knights. The Order initially managed to play Władysław II Jagiełło and his cousin Vytautas against each other, but this strategy failed when Vytautas began to suspect that the Order was planning to annex parts of his territory.

The baptism of Jogaila began the official conversion of Lithuania to Christianity. Although the crusading rationale for the Order's state ended when Prussia and Lithuania had become officially Christian, the Order's feuds and wars with Lithuania and Poland continued. The Lizard Union was created in 1397 by Prussian nobles in Chełmno Land to oppose the Order's policy.

In 1407, the Teutonic Order reached its greatest territorial extent and included the lands of Prussia, Pomerelia, Samogitia, Courland, Livonia, Estonia, Gotland, Dagö, Ösel, and the Neumark, pawned by Brandenburg in 1402.

=== Decline, 1410–1440 ===
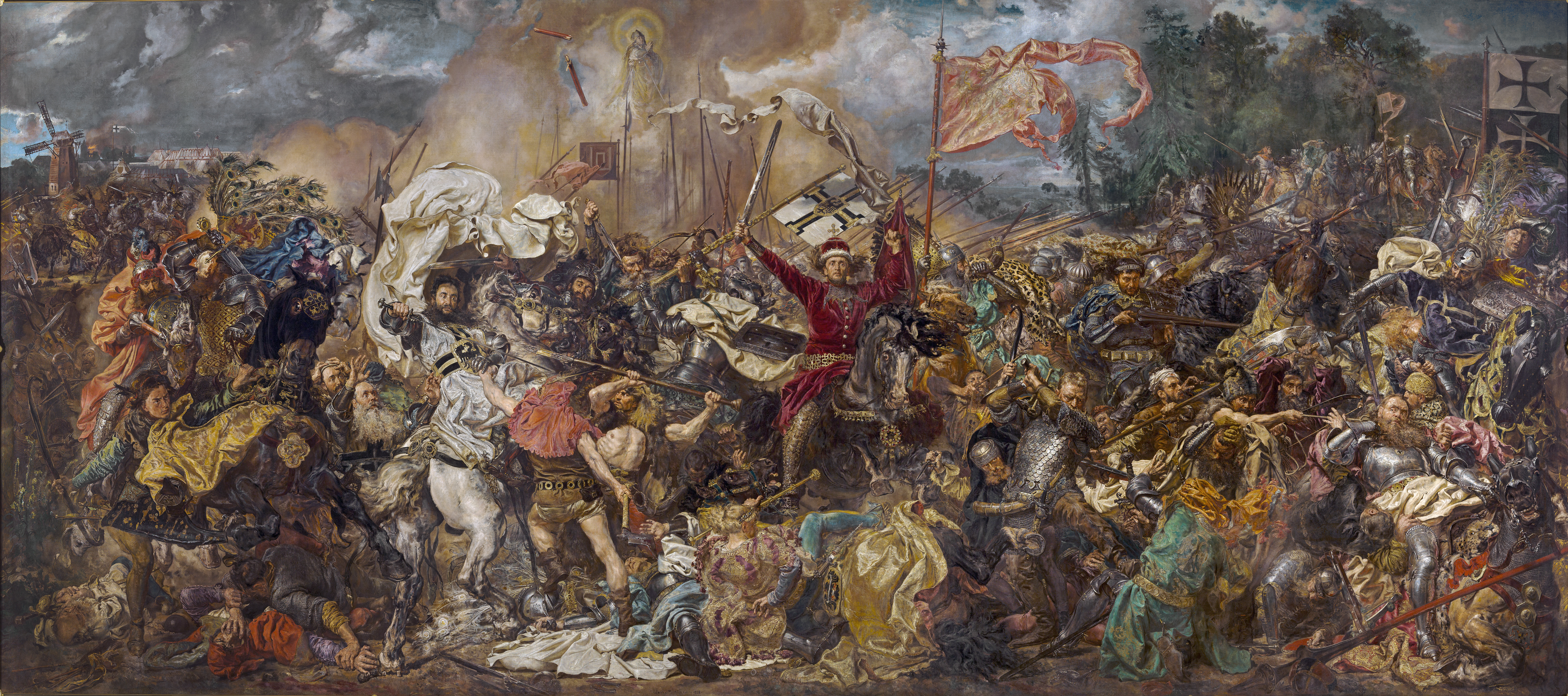
Battle of Grunwald

In 1410, at the Battle of Grunwald a combined Polish–Lithuanian army, led by Władysław II Jagiełło and Vytautas, decisively defeated the Order in the Polish–Lithuanian–Teutonic War. Grand Master Ulrich von Jungingen and most (50 out of 60) of the Order's higher dignitaries fell on the battlefield. The Polish–Lithuanian army then began the Siege of Marienburg (Malbork), the capital of the Order, but was unable to take Marienburg owing to the resistance of Heinrich von Plauen. When the First Peace of Thorn was signed in 1411, the Order managed to retain essentially all of its territories, although the Knights' reputation as invincible warriors was irreparably damaged.

While Poland and Lithuania were growing in power, that of the Teutonic Knights dwindled through infighting. They were forced to impose high taxes to pay a substantial indemnity but did not give the cities sufficient requested representation in the administration of their state. The authoritarian and reforming Grand Master Heinrich von Plauen was forced from power and replaced by Michael Küchmeister von Sternberg, but the new Grand Master was unable to revive the Order's fortunes. After the Gollub War the Knights lost some small border regions and renounced all claims to Samogitia in the 1422 Treaty of Melno. Austrian and Bavarian knights feuded with those from the Rhineland, who likewise bickered with Low German-speaking Saxons, from whose ranks the Grand Master was usually chosen. The western Prussian lands of the Vistula River Valley and the Brandenburg Neumark were ravaged by the Hussites during the Hussite Wars. Some Teutonic Knights were sent to battle the invaders but were defeated by the Bohemian infantry. The Knights also sustained a defeat in the Polish-Teutonic War (1431–1435).

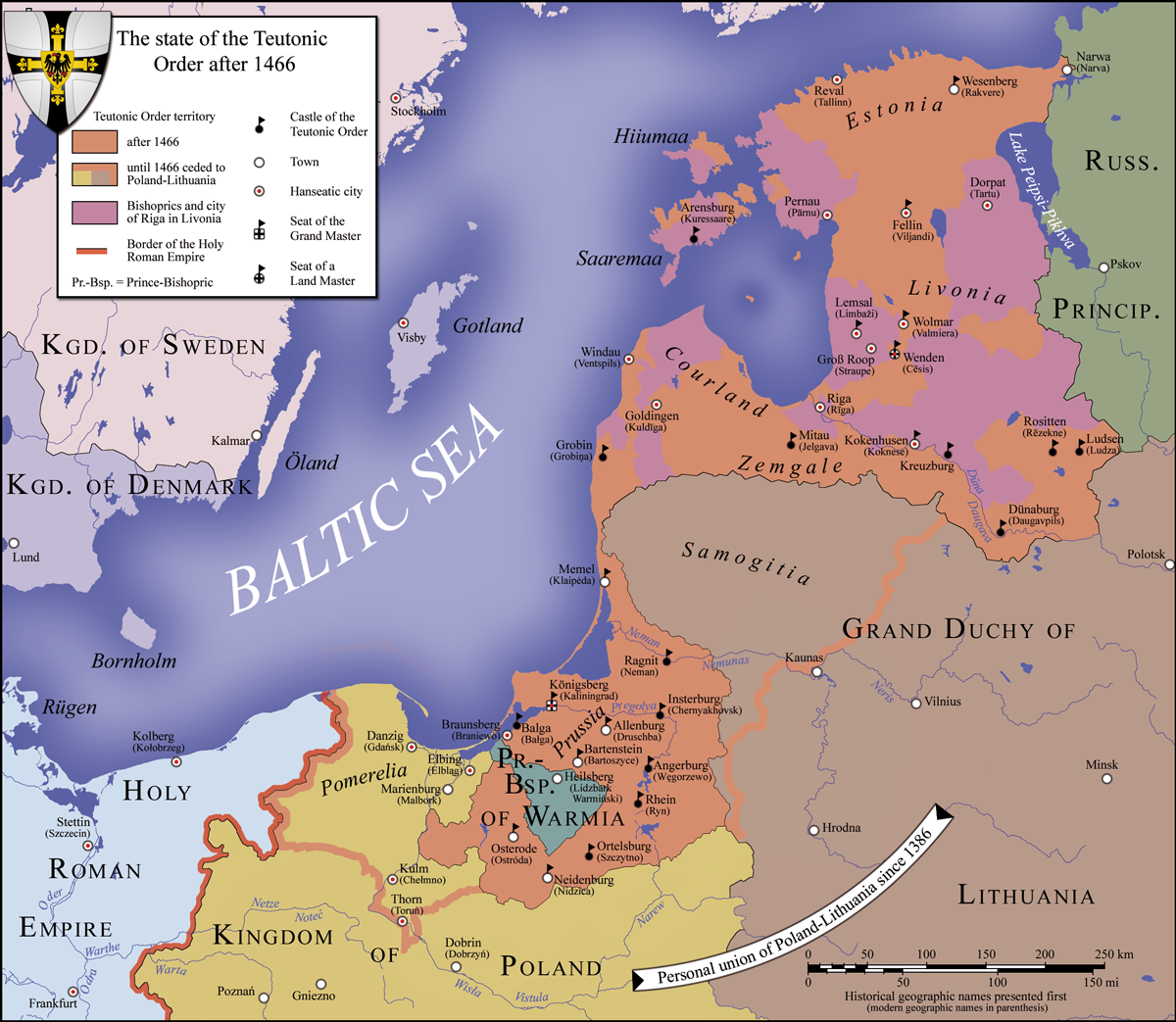
Map of the Teutonic state in 1466

In 1440, the Prussian Confederation was founded by gentry and burghers of the State of the Teutonic Order. In 1454, it rose up against the Order and asked Polish King Casimir IV Jagiellon to incorporate the region into the Kingdom of Poland, to which the King agreed and signed an act of incorporation in Kraków. Mayors, burghers and representatives from the region pledged allegiance to the Polish King during the incorporation in March 1454 in Kraków. This marked the beginning of the Thirteen Years' War between the Teutonic Order and Poland. The main cities of the incorporated territory were authorized by Casimir IV to mint Polish coins. Much of Prussia was devastated in the war, during the course of which the Order returned Neumark to Brandenburg in 1455 to raise funds for war. Because Marienburg Castle was handed over to mercenaries in lieu of their pay, and eventually passed to Poland, the Order moved its base to Königsberg in Sambia. In the Second Peace of Thorn (1466), the defeated Order renounced any claims to the territories of Gdańsk/Eastern Pomerania and Chełmno Land, which were reintegrated with Poland, and the region of Elbląg and Malbork, and the Prince-Bishopric of Warmia, which were also recognized as part of Poland, while retaining the eastern territories in historic Prussia, but as a fief and protectorate of Poland, also considered an integral part of "one and indivisible" Kingdom of Poland. From now on, every Grand Master of the Teutonic Order was obliged to swear an oath of allegiance to the reigning Polish king within six months of taking office. The Grand Master became a prince and counselor of the Polish king and the Kingdom of Poland.

=== Ousted from Prussia, after 1519 ===
After the Polish–Teutonic War (1519–1521), the Order was completely ousted from Prussia when Grand Master Albert of Brandenburg converted to Lutheranism in 1525. He secularized the Order's remaining Prussian territories and assumed from his uncle Sigismund I the Old, King of Poland, the hereditary rights to the Duchy of Prussia as a personal vassal of the Polish Crown, the Prussian Homage. Ducal Prussia retained its currency, laws and faith. The aristocracy was not present in the Sejm.

Although it had lost control of all of its Prussian lands, the Teutonic Order retained its territories within the Holy Roman Empire and Livonia, although the Livonian branch retained considerable autonomy. Many of the Imperial possessions were ruined in the German Peasants' War from 1524 to 1525 and subsequently confiscated by Protestant territorial princes. The Livonian territory was then partitioned by neighboring powers during the Livonian War; in 1561 the Livonian Master Gotthard Kettler secularized the southern Livonian possessions of the Order to create the Duchy of Courland, also a vassal of Poland.

After the loss of Prussia in 1525, the Teutonic Knights concentrated on their possessions in the Holy Roman Empire. Since they held no contiguous territory, they developed a three-tiered administrative system: holdings were combined into commanderies that were administered by a commander (Komtur). Several commanderies were combined to form a bailiwick headed by a Landkomtur. All of the Teutonic Knights' possessions were subordinate to the Grand Master, whose seat was in Bad Mergentheim.

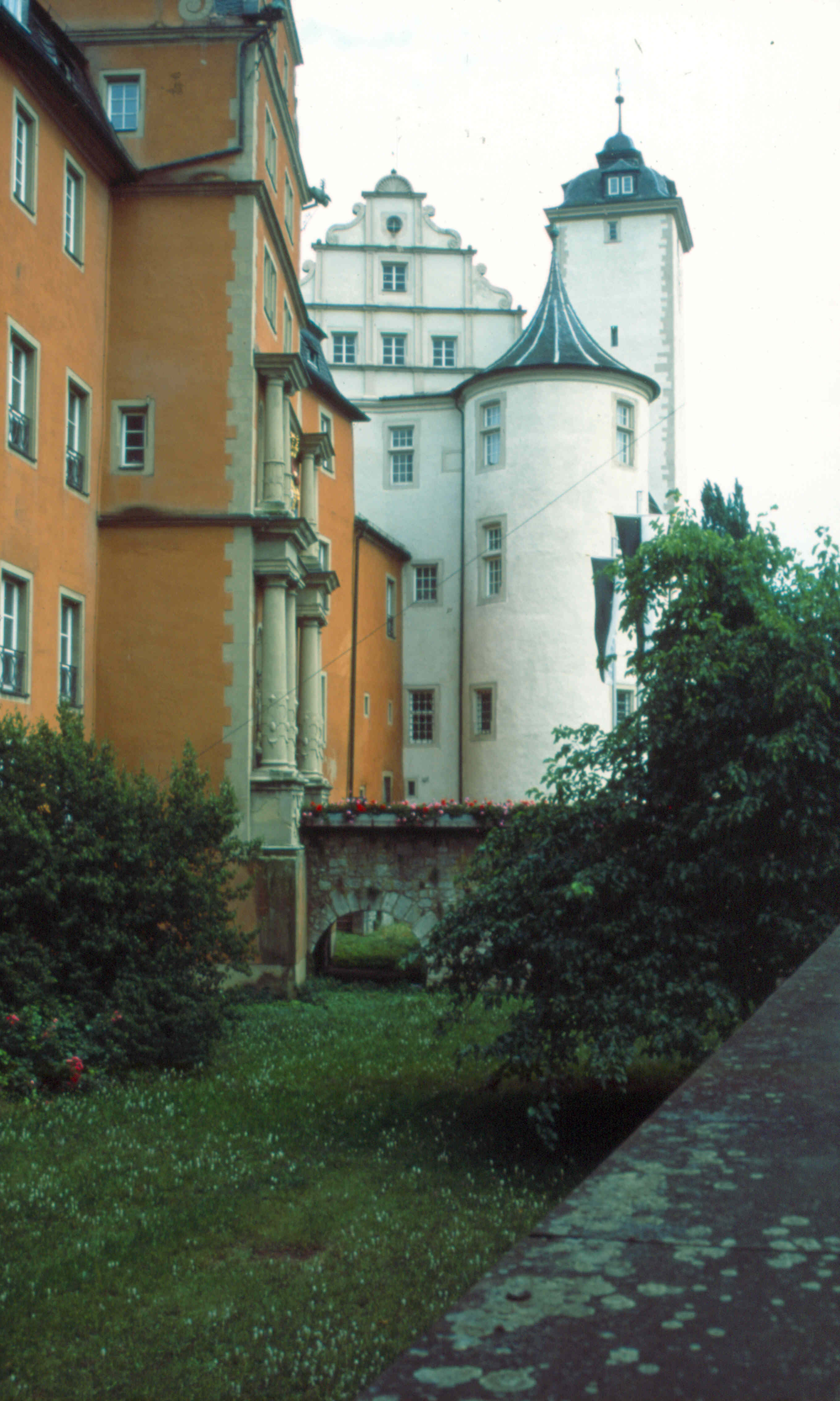
Castle of the Teutonic Order in Bad Mergentheim

There were twelve German bailiwicks:

- Thuringia;
- Alden Biesen (in present-day Belgium);
- Hesse;
- Saxony;
- Westphalia;
- Franconia;
- Koblenz;
- Alsace-Burgundy;
- An der Etsch und im Gebirge (in Tyrol);
- Utrecht;
- Lorraine; and
- Austria.

Outside of German areas were the bailiwicks of

- Sicily;
- Apulia;
- Lombardy;
- Bohemia;
- "Romania" (in Greece); and
- Armenia-Cyprus.

The Order gradually lost control of these holdings until, by 1809, only the seat of the Grand Master at Mergentheim remained.

Following the abdication of Albert of Brandenburg, Walter von Cronberg became Deutschmeister in 1527, and later Administrator of Prussia and Grand Master in 1530. Emperor Charles V combined the two positions in 1531, creating the title Hoch- und Deutschmeister, which also had the rank of Prince of the Empire. A new Grand Magistery was established in Mergentheim in Württemberg, which was attacked during the German Peasants' War. The Order also helped Charles V against the Schmalkaldic League. After the Peace of Augsburg in 1555, membership in the Order was open to Protestants, although the majority of brothers remained Catholic. The Teutonic Knights became tri-denominational, with Catholic, Lutheran and Reformed bailiwicks.

The Grand Masters, often members of the great German families (and, after 1761, members of the House of Habsburg-Lorraine), continued to preside over the Order's considerable holdings in Germany. Teutonic Knights from Germany, Austria, and Bohemia were used as battlefield commanders leading mercenaries for the Habsburg monarchy during the Ottoman wars in Europe.

The military history of the Teutonic Knights was to end in 1805 by the Article XII of the Peace of Pressburg, which ordered the German territories of the Knights converted into a hereditary domain and gave the Austrian Emperor responsibility for placing a Habsburg prince on its throne. These terms had not been fulfilled by the time of the Treaty of Schönbrunn in 1809, and therefore Napoleon Bonaparte ordered the Knights' remaining territory to be disbursed to his German allies, which was completed in 1810.

== Medieval organization ==
=== Administrative structure about 1350 ===
Generalkapitel
Ratsgebietiger	Hochmeister	Kanzlei des Hochmeisters
Großkomtur (Magnus Commendator)	Ordensmarschall (Summus Marescalcus)	Großspittler (Summus Hospitalarius)	Ordenstressler (Summus Thesaurarius)	Ordenstrappier (Summus Trappearius)
Großschäffer (Marienburg)	Großschäffer (Königsberg)
Komtur (Preußen)	Komtur (Preußen)
Deutschmeister (Magister Germaniae)	Landmeister in Livland (Magister Livoniae)
Komtur (Livland)	Komtur (Livland)
Landkomtur	Landkomtur
Komtur (in the Holy Empire)	Komtur (in the Holy Empire)
Hauskomtur	Pfleger	Vogt
Karwansherr	Trappierer	Kellermeister	Küchenmeister	Wachhauptmann	Gesindemeister	Fischmeister

=== Universal leadership ===
==== Generalkapitel ====
The Generalkapitel (general chapter) was the collection of all the priests, knights and half-brothers (German: Halbbrüder). Because of the logistical problems in assembling the members, who were spread over large distances, only deputations of the bailiwicks and commandries gathered to form the General chapter. The General chapter was designed to meet annually, but the conventions were usually limited to the election of a new Grandmaster. The decisions of the Generalkapitel had a binding effect on the Großgebietigers of the order.

==== Hochmeister ====
The Hochmeister (Grand Master) was the highest officer of the order. Until 1525, he was elected by the Generalkapitel. He had the rank of the ruler of an ecclesiastic imperial state and was sovereign prince of Prussia until 1466. Despite this high formal position, in practice, he was only a kind of first among equals.

==== Großgebietige ====
The Großgebietige were high officers with competence on the whole order, appointed by the Hochmeister. There were five offices.

- The Großkomtur (Magnus Commendator), the deputy of the Grandmaster
- The Treßler, the treasurer
- The Spitler (Summus Hospitalarius), responsible for all hospital affairs
- The Trapier, responsible for dressing and armament
- The Marschall (Summus Marescalcus), the chief of military affairs

=== National leadership ===
==== Landmeister ====
The order was divided into three national chapters, Prussia, Livonia and the territory of the Holy Roman Empire of the German Nation. The highest officer of each chapter was the Landmeister (country master). They were elected by the regional chapters. In the beginning, they were only substitutes of the Grandmaster but were able to create a power of their own so that, within their territory, the Grandmaster could not decide against their will. At the end of their rule over Prussia, the Grandmaster was only Landmeister of Prussia. There were three Landmeisters:

- The Landmeister in Livland, the successor of the Herrenmeister (lords master) of the former Livonian Brothers of the Sword.
- The Landmeister of Prussia, after 1309 united with the office of the Grandmaster, who was situated in Prussia from then.
- The Deutschmeister, the Landsmeister of the Holy Roman Empire. When Prussia and Livland were lost, the Deutschmeister also became Grandmaster.

==== Regional leadership ====
Because the properties of the order within the rule of the Deutschmeister did not form a contiguous territory, but were spread over the whole empire and parts of Europe, there was an additional regional structure, the bailiwick. Kammerballeien ("Chamber Bailiwicks") were governed by the Grandmaster himself. Some of these bailiwicks had the rank of imperial states:

- Bailiwick of Thuringia (Seat: Zwätzen)
- Bailiwick of Hesse. (Seat: Marburg)
- Bailiwick of Saxonia (Seat: Elmsburg from 1221 until 1260 moved to Lucklum)
- Brandenburg
- Bailiwick of Westphalia (Seat: Mülheim)
- Bailiwick of Franconia. (Seat: Ellingen)
- Chamber Bailiwick of Koblenz
- Bailiwick of Swabia-Alsace-Burgundy. (Seat: Rouffach (1235–1245), Beuggen Castle (1288–1455), Altshausen (1455–1806))
- Bailiwick at the Etsch and in the Mountains (South Tyrol). (Seat: Bolzano)
- Bailiwick of Utrecht
- Bailiwick of Lorraine (Seat: Trier)
- Bailiwick of France
- Bailiwick of Spain
- Chamber Bailiwick of Austria. (Seat: Vienna)
- Bailiwick of Alden Biesen
- Bailiwick of Sicily
- Bailiwick of Apulia. (Seat: Brindisi (?–1233), Barletta (1233–1350), San Leonardo di Siponto (1350–1483))
- Bailiwick of Central Italy
- Bailiwick of Lombardy (also called Lamparten)
- Chamber Bailiwick of Bohemia
- Bailiwick of Romania (Greece)
- Bailiwick of Armenia (including Cyprus)

=== Local leadership ===
==== Komtur ====
The smallest administrative unit of the order was the Kommende. It was ruled by a Komtur, who had all administrative rights and controlled the Vogteien (district of a reeve) and Zehnthöfe (tithe collectors) within his rule. In the commandry, all kinds of brothers lived together in a monastic way. Noblemen served as Knight-brothers or Priest-brothers. Other people could serve as Sariantbrothers, who were armed soldiers, and as Half-brothers, who were working in the economy and healthcare.

==== Special offices ====
- The Kanzler (chancellor) of the Grandmaster and the Deutschmeister. The chancellor took care of the keys and seals and was also the recording clerk of the chapter.
- The Münzmeister (master of the mint) of Thorn. In 1226, the order received the right to produce its own coins – the Moneta Dominorum Prussiae – Schillingen. Customary laws for coinage did not come about until the Kulm laws of 1233 were written. And the first coins were not minted until late 1234 or early 1235.
- The Pfundmeister (customs master) of Danzig. The Pfund was a local customs duty.
- The Generalprokurator, the representative of the order at the Holy See.
- The Großschäffer, a trading representative with special authority.

== Modern organization ==
=== Evolution and reconfiguration as a Catholic religious order ===
The Catholic order continued to exist in the various territories ruled by the Austrian Empire, out of Napoleon's reach. From 1804 the Order was headed by members of the Habsburg dynasty.

The collapse of the Habsburg monarchy and the Empire it governed in Austria, the Italian Tyrol, Bohemia and the Balkans brought a shattering crisis to the Order. While in the new Austrian Republic, the Order seemed to have some hope of survival, in the other former parts of the Habsburg territories, the tendency was to regard the Order as an honorary chivalric Order of the House of Habsburg. The consequence of this risked being the confiscation of the Order's property as belongings of the House of Habsburg. So as to make the distinction clearer, in 1923 the then High Master, Field Marshal Eugen of Austria-Teschen, Archduke of Austria, a member of the House of Habsburg and an active army commander before and during the First World War, had one of the Order's priests, Norbert Klein, at the time Bishop of Brno (Brünn) elected his Coadjutor and then abdicated, leaving the Bishop as High Master of the Order.

As a result of this move, by 1928 the now-independent former Habsburg territories all recognized the Order as a Catholic religious order. The Order itself introduced a new Rule, approved by Pope Pius XI in 1929, according to which the government of the Order would in the future be in the hands of a priest of the Order, as would its constituent provinces, while the women religious of the Order would have women superiors. In 1936 the situation of the women religious was further clarified and the Congregation of the Sisters of the Order was given as their supreme moderator the High Master of the Order, the Sisters also having representation at the Order's general chapter.

This completed the transformation of what remained in the Catholic Church of the Teutonic knights into a Catholic religious order now renamed simply the Deutscher Orden ("German Order"). However, further difficulties were in store.

The Fascist rule in Italy, which since the end of the First World War had absorbed the Southern Tyrol, was not a propitious setting, but following the end of hostilities, a now democratic Italy provided normalized conditions. In 1947, Austria legally abolished the measures taken against the Order and restored confiscated property. Despite being hampered by the Communist regimes in Yugoslavia and in Czechoslovakia, the Order was now broadly in a position to take up activities in accordance with elements of its tradition, including care for the sick, for the elderly, for children, including work in education, in parishes and in its own internal houses of study. In 1957 a residence was established in Rome for the Order's Procurator General to the Holy See, to serve also as a pilgrim hostel. Conditions in Czechoslovakia gradually improved and in the meanwhile, the forced exile of some members of the Order led to the Order's re-establishing itself with some modest, but historically significant, foundations in Germany. The Sisters, in particular, gained several footholds, including specialist schools and care of the poor and in 1953 the former house of Augustinian Canons, St. Nikola, in Passau became the Sisters' Motherhouse. Although the reconstruction represented by the reformed Rule of 1929 had set aside categories such as the knights, over time the spontaneous involvement of laypeople in the Order's apostolates has led to their revival in a modernized form, a development formalized by Pope Paul VI in 1965.

With the official title of "Brethren of the German House of St Mary in Jerusalem", the Order today is unambiguously a Catholic religious order, though sui generis. Various features of its life and activities recall those of monastic and mendicant orders. At its core are priests who make a solemn religious profession, along with lay brothers who make a perpetual simple profession. Also part of the Order are the Sisters, with internal self-government within their own structures but with representation in the Order's General Chapter. Their ultimate superior is the High Master of the Order. The approximately 100 Catholic priests and 200 nuns of the Order are divided into five provinces, namely, Austria-Italy, Slovenia, Germany, Czech Republic and Slovakia. While the priests predominantly provide spiritual guidance, the nuns primarily care for the ill and the aged. Many of the priests care for German-speaking communities outside of Germany and Austria, especially in Italy and Slovenia; in this sense, the Teutonic Order has returned to its 12th-century roots: the spiritual and physical care of Germans in foreign lands.

There is an Institute of "Familiares", most of whom are laypeople, and who are attached by spiritual bonds to the Order but do not take vows. The "Familiares" are grouped especially into the bailiwicks of Germany, Austria, Southern Tyrol, Ad Tiberim (Rome), and the bailiwick of the Czech Republic and Slovakia, as also in the independent commandry of Alden Biesen in Belgium, though others are dispersed throughout the world. Overall, there are in recent years some 700.

By the end of the 20th century, then, this religious Order had developed into a charitable organization and established numerous clinics, as well as sponsoring excavation and tourism projects in Israel. In 2000, the German chapter of the Teutonic Order declared bankruptcy, and its upper management was dismissed; an investigation by a special committee of the Bavarian parliament in 2002 and 2003 to determine the cause was inconclusive.

The current Abbot General of the Order, who also holds the title of High Master, is Father Frank Bayard. The current seat of the High Master is the Church of the German Order ("Deutschordenskirche") in Vienna. Near the St Stephen's Cathedral ("Stephansdom") in the Austrian capital is the Treasury of the Teutonic Order, which is open to the public, and the Order's central archive. Since 1996, there has also been a museum dedicated to the Teutonic Knights at their former castle in Bad Mergentheim in Germany, which was the seat of the High Master from 1525 to 1809.

=== Numismatic commemoration ===
Germany 10 Deutsche Mark 1990 Teutonic Order silver coin obverse reverse

In 1990, the Federal Republic of Germany officially commemorated the 800th anniversary of the founding of the Teutonic Order by issuing a special 10 Deutsche Mark silver coin. Struck from .625 fine silver at the Hamburg Mint (indicated by the mintmark "J"), the coin was designed by the German artist and medalist Doris Waschk-Balz. The obverse depicts the Virgin Mary holding the Christ Child on the official banner of the Teutonic Order, with the order's coat of arms positioned in the upper left, encircled by the inscription "800 JAHRE DEUTSCHER ORDEN" and the historic anniversary dates "1190–1990". The reverse displays the official German Federal Eagle encircled by the inscription "BUNDESREPUBLIK DEUTSCHLAND", the face value "10 DEUTSCHE MARK", the mintmark "J", and the year of minting, 1990. The coin's edge features the incuse inscription "ES BLEIB IN GEDÄCHTNIS SO LANG GOTT WILL" (It shall remain in memory as long as God wills).

==== Honorary Knights ====
Order of Brothers of the German House of Saint Mary in Jerusalem
- Coat of arms of the order

Awarded by Pope Leo XIV
- Type: Dynasty order of chivalry
- Established: 1190
- Country: Holy See
- Religious affiliation: Catholic Church
- Ribbon: Black
- Motto: Helfen, Wehren, Heilen
- Grand Master: Frank Bayard
- Grades: Honorary Knight

Statistics
- Total inductees: 11?

Precedence
- Next (higher): Sovereign Military Order of Malta
- Next (lower): Pro Ecclesia et Pontifice
- Ribbon bar

Honorary Knights of the Teutonic Order have included:

- Konrad Adenauer
- Udo Arnold
- Franz Josef II
- Rudolf Graber
- Otto von Habsburg
- Karl Habsburg-Lothringen
- Joachim Meisner
- Eduard Gaston Pöttickh von Pettenegg
- Eduard Schick
- Christoph Schönborn
- Carl Herzog von Württemberg

=== Protestant Bailiwick of Utrecht ===
A portion of the Order retains more of the character of the knights during the height of its power and prestige. Der Balije van Utrecht ("Bailiwick of Utrecht") of the Ridderlijke Duitsche Orde ("Chivalric German [i.e., 'Teutonic'] Order") became Protestant at the Reformation, and it remained an aristocratic society. The relationship of the Bailiwick of Utrecht to the Catholic Deutscher Orden resembles that of the Protestant Bailiwick of Brandenburg to the Catholic Order of Malta: each is an authentic part of its original order, though differing from and smaller than the Catholic branch.

== Insignia ==
The Knights wore white surcoats with a black cross, granted by Innocent III in 1205. A cross pattée was sometimes used. The coat of arms representing the grandmaster (Hochmeisterwappen) is shown with a golden cross fleury or cross potent superimposed on the black cross, with the imperial eagle as a central inescutcheon. The golden cross fleury overlaid on the black cross became widely used in the 15th century. A legendary account attributes its introduction to Louis IX of France, who is said to have granted the master of the order this cross as a variation of the Jerusalem cross, with the fleur-de-lis symbol attached to each arm, in 1250. While this legendary account cannot be traced back further than the early modern period (Christoph Hartknoch, 1684), there is some evidence that the design does indeed date to the mid 13th century.

The black cross pattée was later used for military decoration and insignia by the Kingdom of Prussia and Germany as the Iron Cross.

The motto of the Order is "Helfen, Wehren, Heilen" ("to help, to defend, to heal").

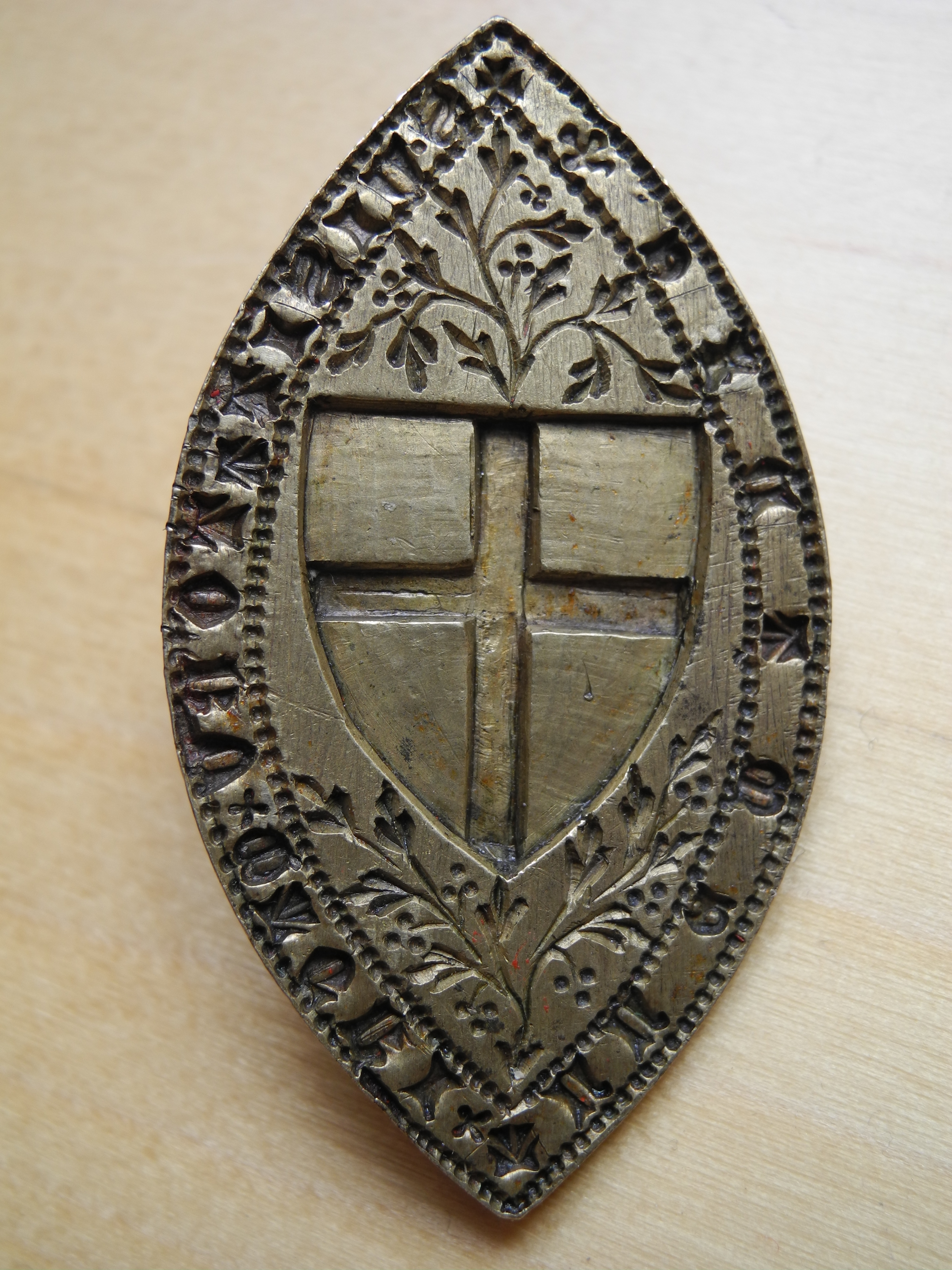
14th-century brass stamp with the shield insignia

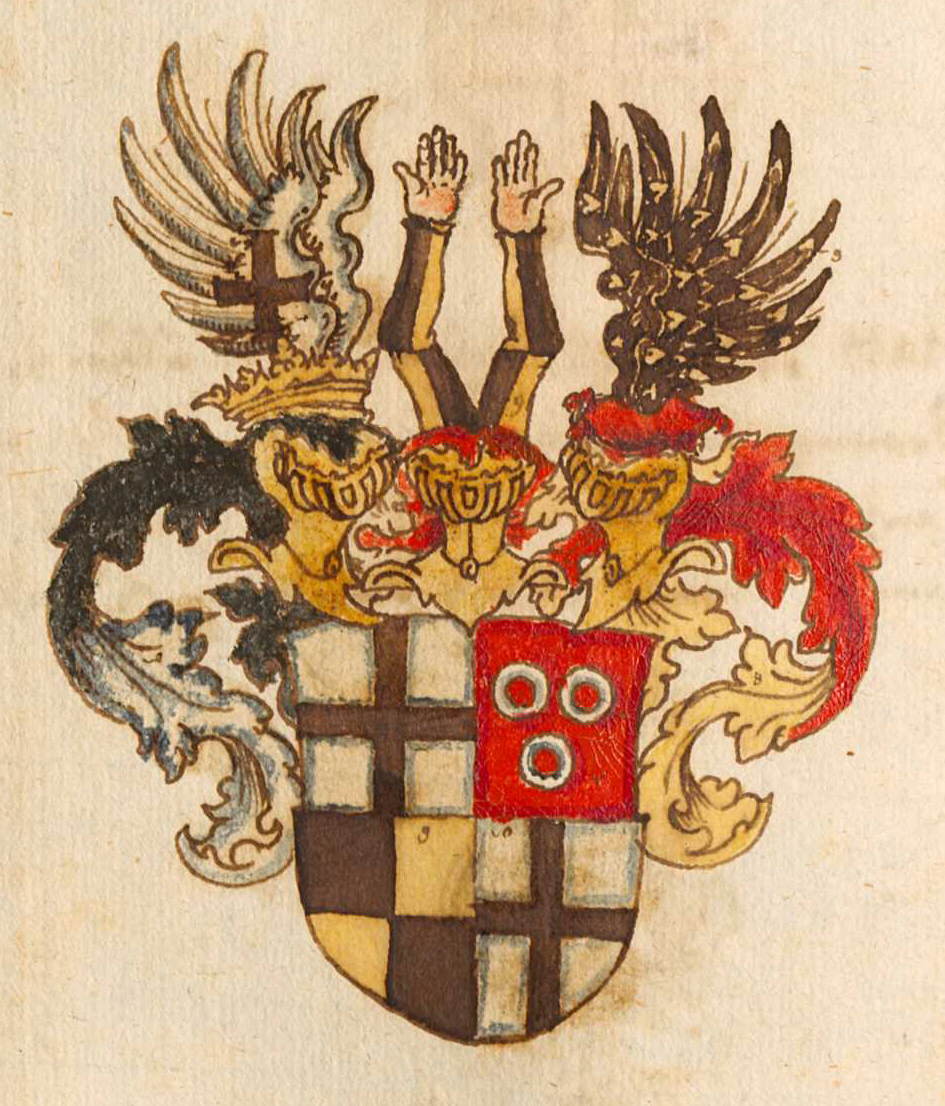
In the 16th century, officers of the order would quarter their family arms with the order's arms.

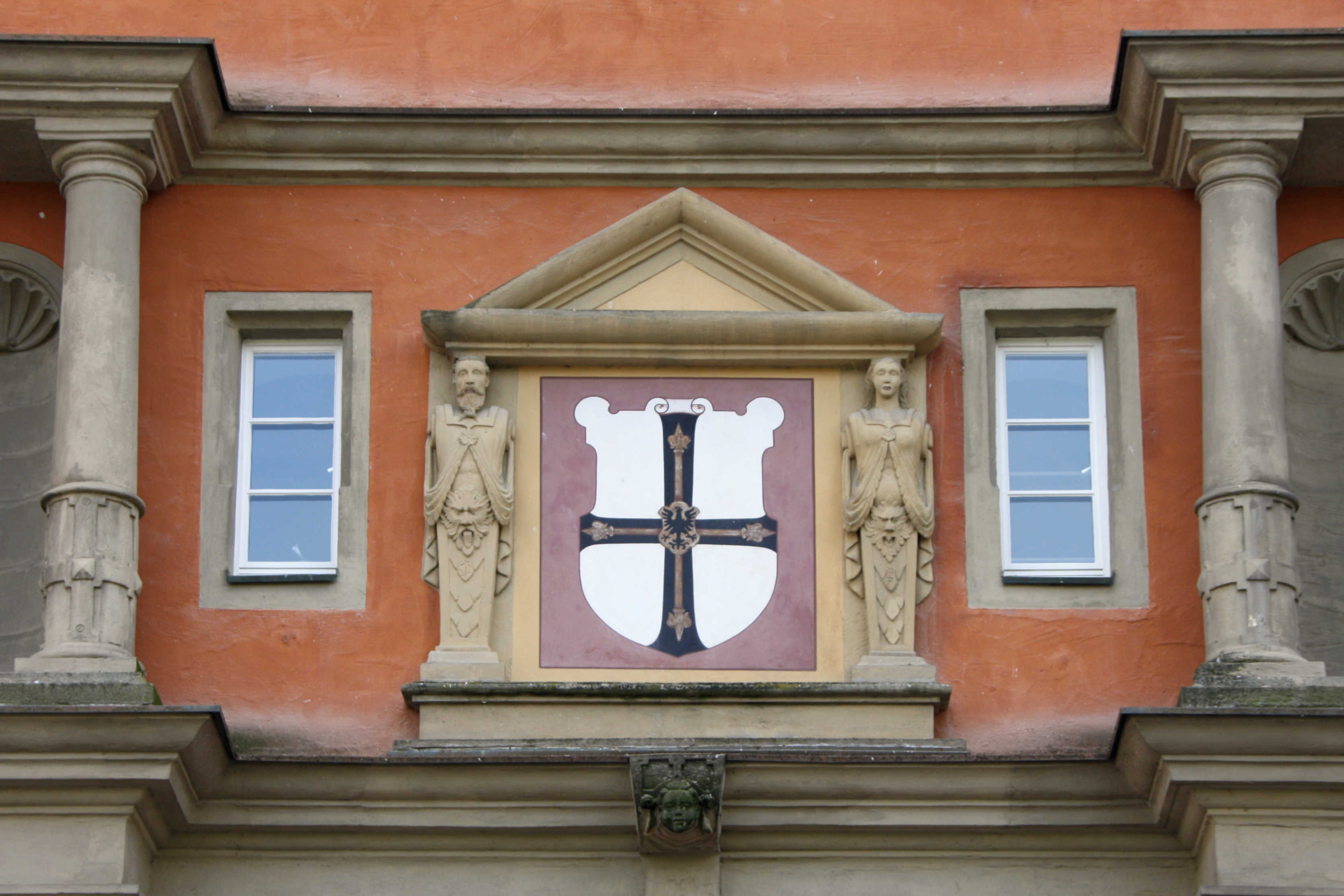
Example of the Deutschmeisterwappen on the gate of the Bad Mergentheim residence

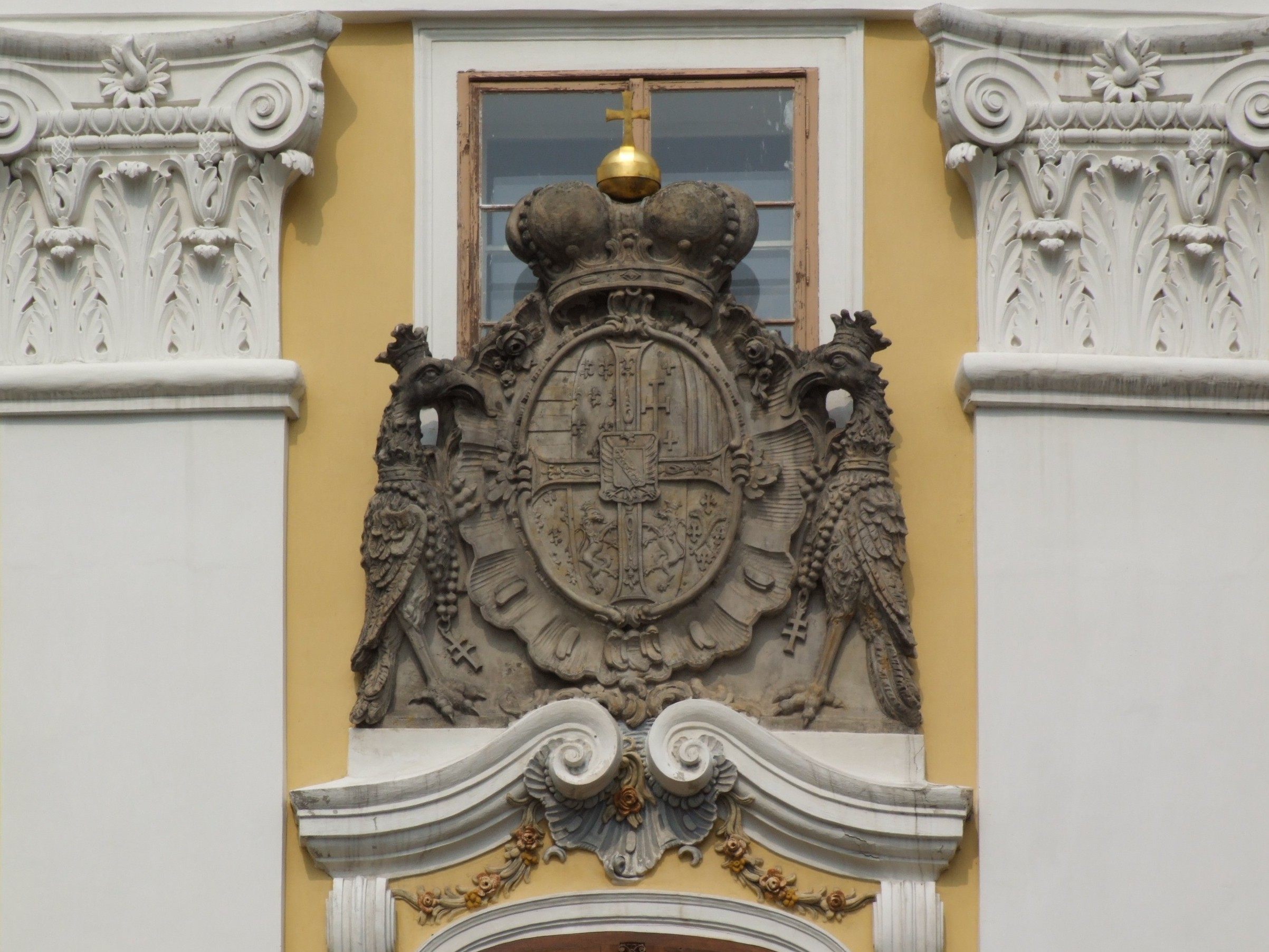
Coat of arms of Prince Charles Alexander of Lorraine, Grand Master from 1761 to 1780

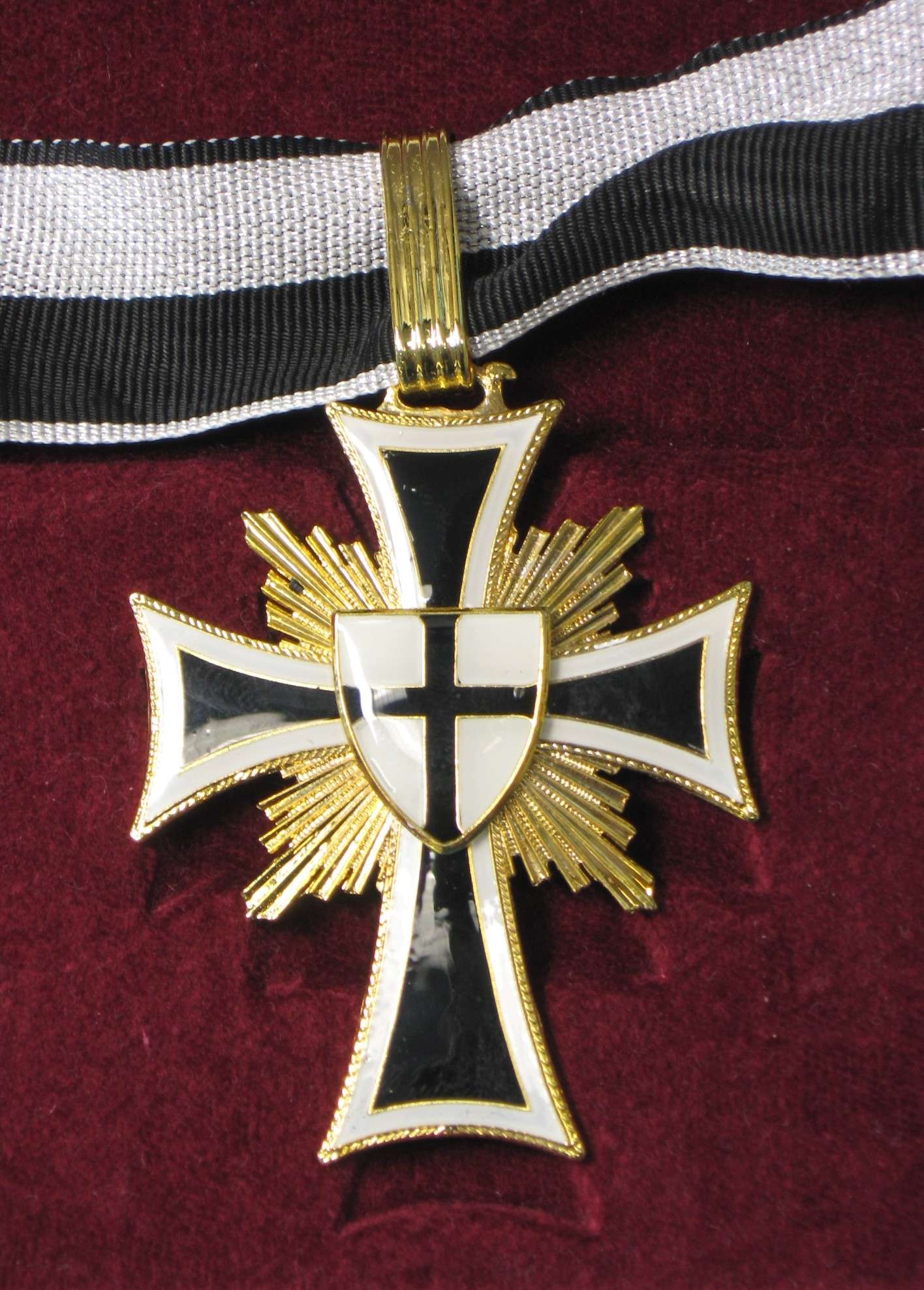
Modern (20th century) medal

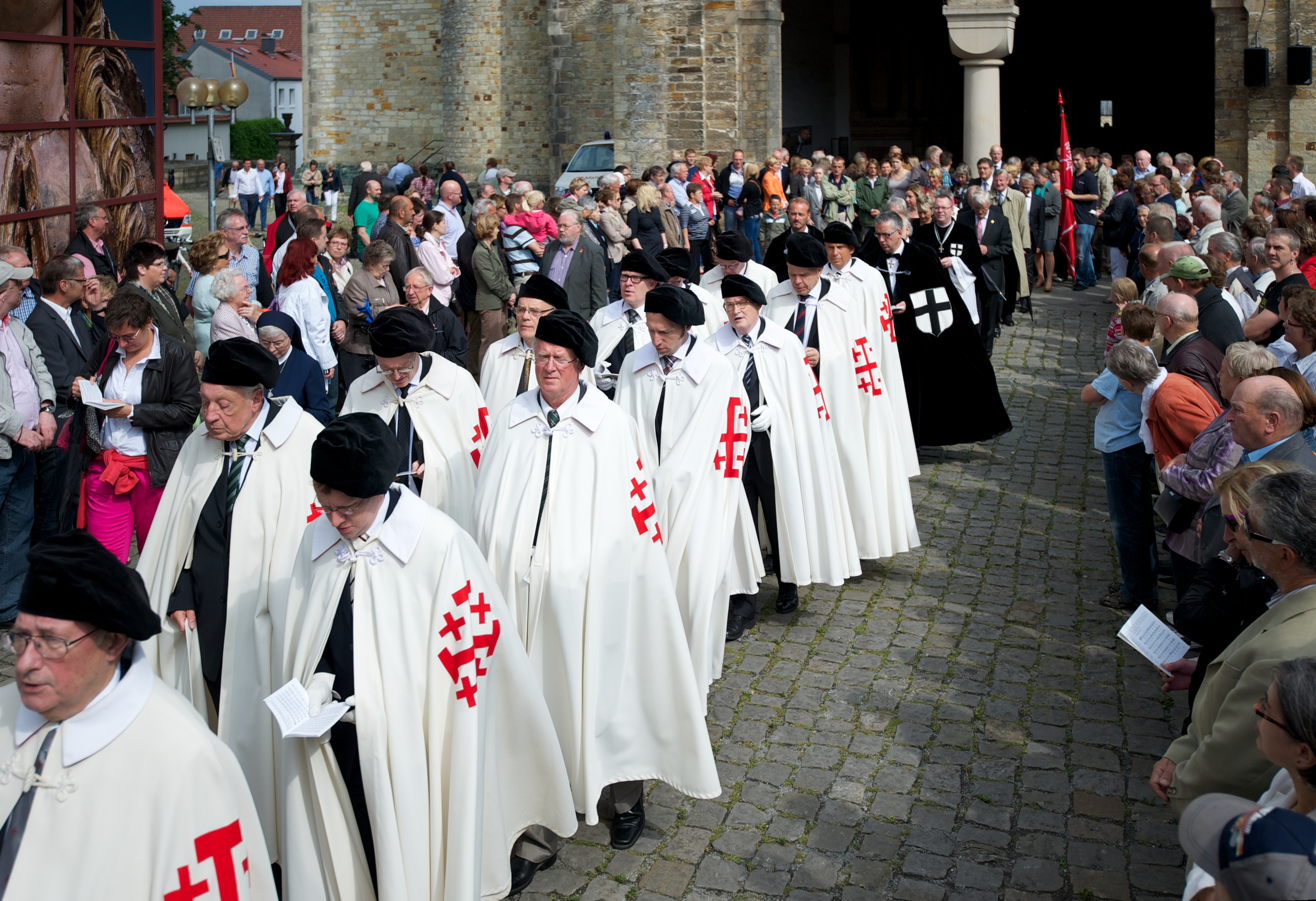
Procession in honour of Saint Liborius of Le Mans with Knights of the Holy Sepulchre together with Teutonic Knights in Paderborn, Germany

== Influence on German and Polish nationalism and Soviet patriotism ==
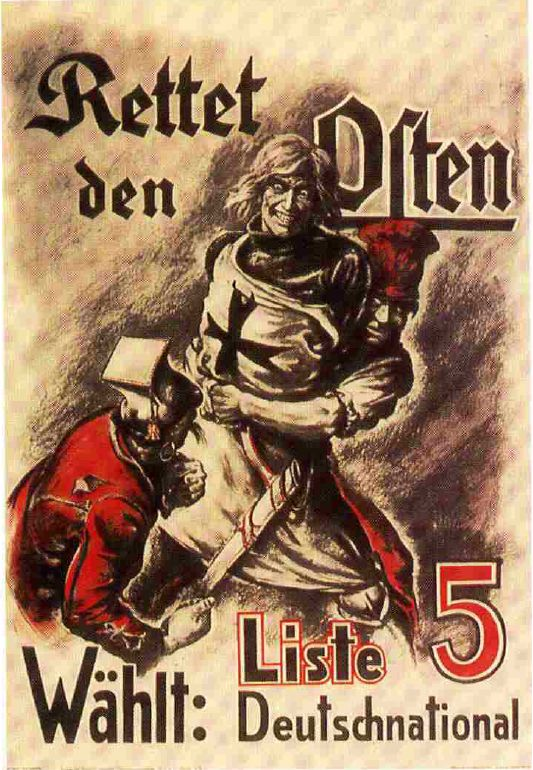
^α A German National People's Party poster from 1920 showing a Teutonic knight being attacked by Poles and socialists. The caption reads "Rescue the East".

The State of the Teutonic Order (whose flag is shown here) greatly influenced the history of Prussia, which became the dominant German state and the source for most of the new war ensign's visual elements.

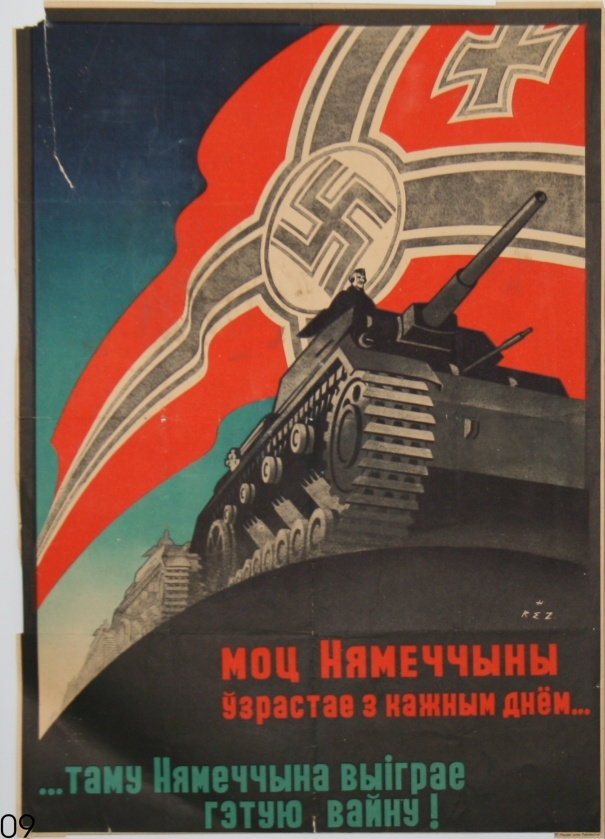
^{β} A Nazi propaganda poster in the Belarusian language. It shows the image of a tank under the Nazi flag.

1935–1938 war ensign

1938–1945 war ensign

The German historian Heinrich von Treitschke used imagery of the Teutonic Knights, a Germanic myth, to promote pro-German and anti-Polish rhetoric. Many middle-class German nationalists adopted this imagery and its symbols. During the Weimar Republic, associations and organisations of this nature contributed to laying the groundwork for the formation of Nazi Germany.

An organization predating the Nazi Party itself,^{α} as well as Nazi-supported preceding and Nazi propaganda preceding and during^{[β]} World War II made use of the Teutonic Knights' imagery, with the common goal of instilling the importance of Lebensraum for the future of Germany and the German people. According to medieval historian Eric Christiansen, "Himmler's plan to mould the SS as a reincarnation of [The Teutonic Order] proved [...] the irresistible strength of bad history." Though gradually taking hold ever since with one of Prince Adalbert of Prussia's 1849 proposals, after a lull during the Weimar Republic, whereupon it reverted to a simple tricolor overlaid with an Iron Cross (though itself also derivative), a version of Germany's Reichskriegsflagge (war ensign)^{[β]} emerged more closely resembling The State of the Teutonic Order's cross's original shape with a circle-overlaid balkenkreuz. Hitler based his German Order on the Teutonic Order, while especially the Hochmeister's ceremonial regalia, also the Marian Cross of the Teutonic Order, the Knight's Cross of the Iron Cross and of the cross of the Knight of Justice of the Order of St. John (Bailiwick of Brandenburg).

After Hitler approved the Generalplan Ost (GPO), Germanization campaigns were extolled as the modern adaptation of what it portrayed as "civilizing missions" of the Teutonic Order. Yet, despite these references to the Teutonic Order's history in Nazi propaganda, the Order itself was abolished in 1938 and its members were persecuted by the German authorities. This occurred mostly due to Hitler's and Himmler's belief that, throughout history, Catholic military-religious orders had been tools of the Holy See and as such constituted a threat to the Nazi regime.

The converse was true for Polish nationalism, for example The Knights of the Cross by Henryk Sienkiewicz, which used the Teutonic Knights as symbolic shorthand for Germans in general, conflating the two into an easily recognisable image of the hostile. After the Battle of Grunwald, the Teutonic Order was portrayed as the medieval forerunners of Hitler's armies.

In the Soviet Union, the image of Alexander Nevsky became a national symbol of the struggle against German occupation during World War II, and many Soviet historians portrayed him as a Russian bastion against both German and papal aggression. The government sought historical continuity by referring to the Soviet struggle as the Great Patriotic War. The Order of Alexander Nevsky was re-established in 1942 by the Soviet government during the war, which would be awarded to servicemen in the Soviet army. The 1938 film Alexander Nevsky by Sergei Eisenstein, which depicts the Battle on the Ice, was re-released in 1941 following the German invasion. Joseph Stalin used the film to mobilize feelings of Russian patriotism.

== See also ==
- Prussian virtues
- Teutonic Knights in popular culture

== Bibliography ==
- Christiansen, Eric (1997). The Northern Crusades. London: Penguin Books. pp. 287. ISBN 0-14-026653-4.
- Górski, Karol (1949). Związek Pruski i poddanie się Prus Polsce: zbiór tekstów źródłowych (in Polish and Latin). Poznań: Instytut Zachodni.
- Innes-Parker, Catherine (2013). Anchoritism in the Middle Ages: Texts and Traditions. Cardiff: University of Wales Press. p. 256. ISBN 978-0-7083-2601-5.
- Martin, Janet (2007). Medieval Russia, 980–1584. Cambridge University Press. pp. 175–219. ISBN 9780511811074.
- Nicolle, David (15 March 1997). Lake Peipus 1242: Battle of the ice. Bloomsbury USA. ISBN 978-1-85532-553-1.
- Selart, Anti (2015). Livonia, Rus' and the Baltic Crusades in the Thirteenth Century. Leiden: Brill. p. 400. ISBN 978-9-00-428474-6.
- Seward, Desmond (1995). The Monks of War: The Military Religious Orders. London: Penguin Books. p. 416. ISBN 0-14-019501-7.
- Sterns, Indrikis (1985). "VIII: The Teutonic Knights in the Crusader States". In Zacour, Norman P.; Hazard, Harry W. (eds.). A History of the Crusades: The Impact of the Crusades on the Near East. Vol. V. Madison: The University of Wisconsin Press. pp. 315–378 (see 361–362 on Transylvania intermezzo). ISBN 0299091449.
- Urban, William (2003). The Teutonic Knights: A Military History. London: Greenhill Books. p. 290. ISBN 1-85367-535-0.
