= Bruno Platter =

Roman Catholic leader

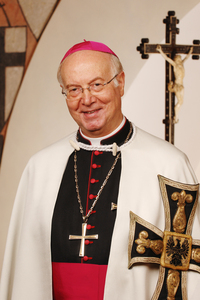
Bruno Platter

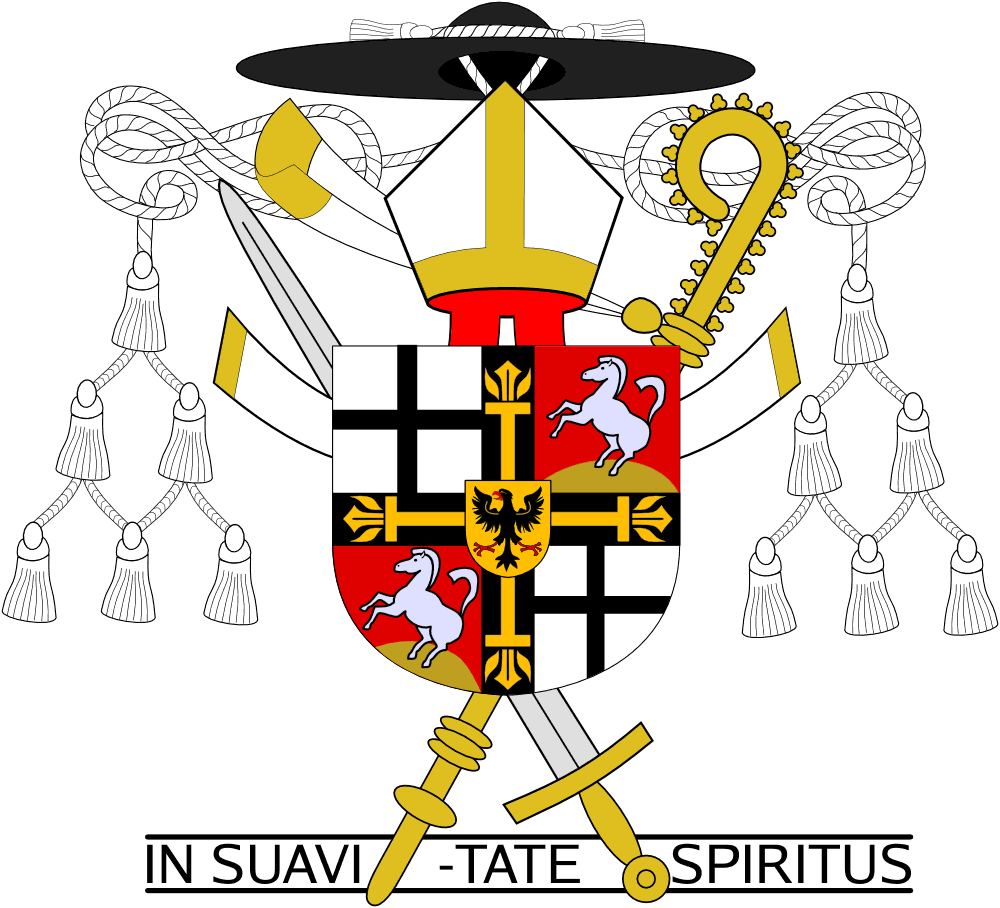
Coat of arms of Bruno Platter

Bruno Platter (born 21 March 1944) is a former Grand Master of the Teutonic Order. He was the order's 65th Grand Master. He served three terms and retired in 2018 at the age of 74.

Platter was born in South Tyrol, Italy.

Grand Master of the Teutonic Order
Preceded by Arnold Wieland	Hochmeister; 2000–2018	Succeeded by Frank Bayard
