= Frank Bayard =

German Catholic priest and Teutonic Grand Master (born 1971)

Superior General Frank Bayard OT
- Grand Master and Abbot
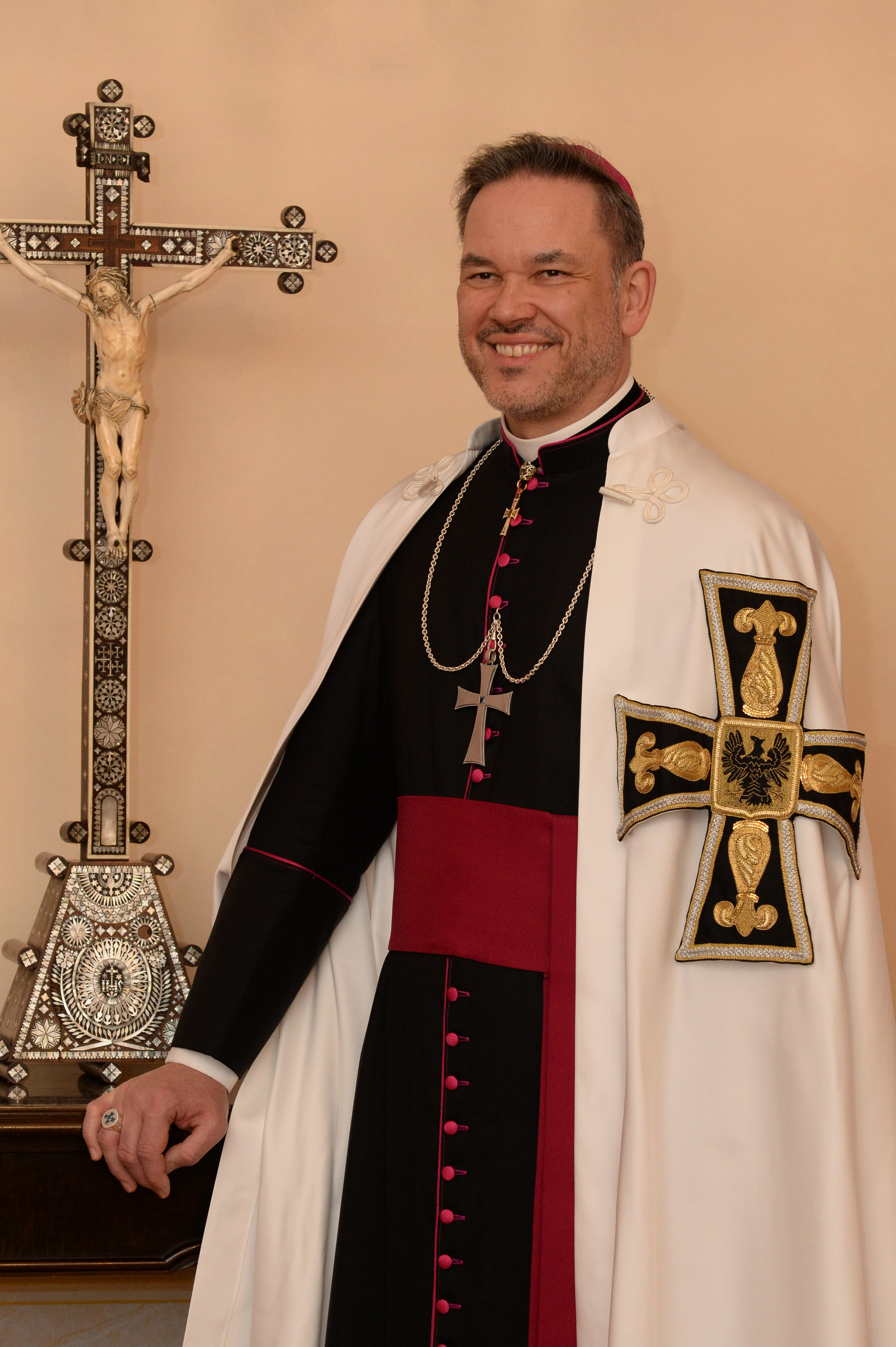
- Elected: 22 August 2018
- In office: 2018–present
- Predecessor: Bruno Platter
- Previous post: General Treasurer of the Teutonic Order

Orders
- Ordination: 22 July 2006 by Friedrich Wetter

Personal details
- Born: 11 October 1971 (age 54) Püttlingen, Saarland, West Germany
- Denomination: Catholic Church
- Residence: Vienna
- Profession: Banker
- Education: Allensbach Hochschule
- Motto: Noli timere – meus es tu (Do not fear – you are mine)
- Coat of arms

Frank Bayard (born 11 October 1971) is a German Catholic priest and 66th Grand Master of the Teutonic Order.

== Early life ==
After completing an apprenticeship as a banker at Deutsche Bank, Bayard studied business administration and European economics at the Wissenschaftliche Hochschule Lahr (WHL), graduating with a degree in business administration.

== Religious life ==
In 2000, Bayard entered the Teutonic Order, made his perpetual profession on 19 September 2004, and studied philosophy, Catholic theology, history, and health care management in Innsbruck and Vienna from 2001 to 2008. On 22 July 2006, he received the sacrament of priestly ordination in the Collegiate Church of Weyarn from the Archbishop of Munich and Freising, Cardinal Friedrich Wetter. Since 2015, he has been a parochial vicar of the parish of Gumpoldskirchen in the Archdiocese of Vienna.

In 2006 he was elected to the General Government of the Teutonic Order as General Councillor of the German Brotherly Province. From 2008 to 2018, he served as the order's general treasurer. On 22 August 2018, at the General Chapter of the Teutonic Order in Vienna, Bayard was elected to succeed Bruno Platter as Abbot General and Grand Master of the Order for a six-year term and was immediately installed in office. On 17 November of the same year, the abbatial blessing was imparted to him by the cardinal Archbishop of Vienna, Christoph Schönborn, in St. Stephen's Cathedral in Vienna.

After the founding of the Austrian Conference of Religious Orders in December 2019, as a merger of the Superior's Conference and the Association of Women's Orders of Austria, the women's and men's orders of the Archdiocese of Vienna and the Diocese of Eisenstadt, the Diocesan Conference of Vienna/Eisenstadt, chaired by Secretary General Christine Rod, appointed Bayard as president of the Diocesan Conference of Vienna/Eisenstadt on 15 September 2020. Bayard was also appointed a member of the board of the Institute of Austrian Religious Orders.

After the Russian invasion of Ukraine, Bayard made a personal donation of €5,000 and a donation of €10,000 from the Order to the local government of Malbork in order to help Ukrainian refugees there.

Bayard's term of office as Grand Master of the Teutonic Order was extended beyond the usual six years, partly due to the COVID-19 pandemic.

During the General Chapter of the Teutonic Order in Vienna, Bayard was re-elected on 17 February 2026 for a new six-year period.

== Honours ==
- Grand Cross of the Order pro Merito Melitensi – Ecclesiastical class pro Piis Meritis Melitensi (13 October 2021). Awarded as a sign of the solidarity of the two orders of chivalry and in recognition of the achievements of the Teutonic Order in the service of the "Lord's Sick".

Grand Master of the Teutonic Order
Preceded by Bruno Platter	Hochmeister; 2018–present	Incumbent
