= Wolfsheim =

Wolfsheim can refer to:

- Wolfsheim, Germany, a village south-west of Mainz, Germany
- Wolfsheim (band), a synthpop band from Hamburg, Germany
- Meyer Wolfsheim (sometimes spelled "Wolfshiem"), a character in F. Scott Fitzgerald's The Great Gatsby

== See also ==
- Wolfisheim, a commune in the Bas-Rhin department, France
