= Südwestrundfunk =

German regional public broadcasting corporation

SWR Fernsehen
- Type: Broadcast radio, television and online
- Country: Germany
- Headquarters: Stuttgart, Baden-Württemberg, Germany
- Area: Baden-Württemberg and Rhineland-Palatinate
- Launch date: 1 October 1998 (28 years ago)
- Official website: swr.de
- Replaced: SDR and SWF

Südwestrundfunk (pronounced [zyːtˈvɛstˌʁʊntfʊŋk]; lit. 'Southwest Broadcasting'), shortened to SWR (pronounced [ˌɛsveːˈʔɛʁ]), is a regional public broadcasting corporation serving the southwest of Germany, specifically the federal states of Baden-Württemberg and Rhineland-Palatinate. The corporation has main offices in three cities: Stuttgart, Baden-Baden and Mainz, with the director's office being in Stuttgart. It is a part of the ARD consortium.

It broadcasts on two television channels and six radio channels, with its main television and radio office in Baden-Baden and regional offices in Stuttgart and Mainz. It is the second largest broadcasting organization in Germany behind WDR. SWR, with a coverage of 55,600 km^{2} (21,500 sq mi), and an audience reach estimated to be 14.7 million. SWR employs 3,700 people in its various offices and facilities.

== History ==
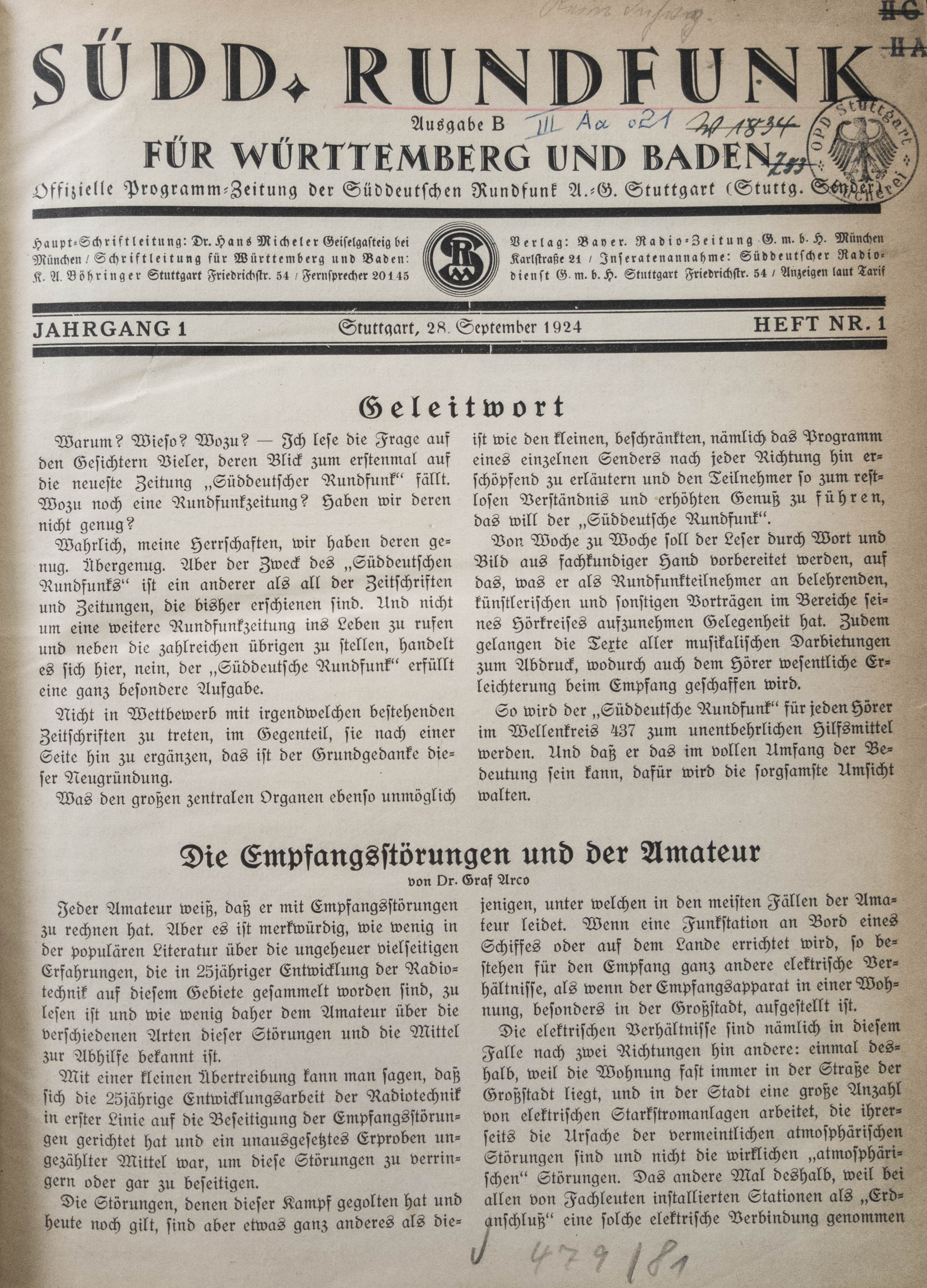
Program guide of Süddeutsche Rundfunk AG (SÜRAG) Stuttgart (18 September 1924)

SWR was established on 1 January 1998 through the merger of Süddeutscher Rundfunk (SDR, Southern German Broadcasting), formerly headquartered in Stuttgart, and Südwestfunk (SWF, South West Radio), formerly headquartered in Baden-Baden. The new corporation began broadcasting on 1 September 1998. Its predecessor organizations, SDR and SWF, were formally dissolved at 24:00 on 30 September 1998, SWR legally succeeding them with effect from 0:00 on 1 October 1998.

The existence of two public broadcasting corporations in southwest Germany was a legacy of the Allied occupation of Germany after the Second World War. The French Military Government established SWF as the sole public broadcaster in their occupation zone. This area was later divided into the states of South Baden, Württemberg-Hohenzollern and Rhineland-Palatinate. The American Military Government established SDR in Württemberg-Baden. When Baden, Württemberg-Hohenzollern and Württemberg-Baden merged to form Baden-Württemberg in 1952, the corporations were not merged, although SDR and SWF operated several joint services.

The two corporations had intended to merge in 1990, but the merger was pushed back by the reunification process.

Several channel mergers and changes took effect from 1 September 1998:

- SWF 1 and SDR 1 became SWR1 Baden-Württemberg and SWR1 Rheinland-Pfalz: regional programmes for their respective states (Länder)
- S 2 Kultur became SWR2
- SWF3 and SDR 3 became the pop station SWR3
- S 4 Baden-Württemberg became SWR4 Baden-Württemberg
- SWF 4 Rheinland-Pfalz became SWR4 Rheinland-Pfalz
- DASDING was unchanged and continued broadcasting
- The television channel Südwest 3 became Südwest BW and Südwest RP, and today transmits as SWR Fernsehen

A radio news channel, SWR cont.ra, was added in July 2002. This was relaunched with a new programme format on 9 January 2012 as SWRinfo. It was relaunched again as SWR Aktuell on 6 February 2017.

== Finances ==
Licensing fees required for radio and TV sets are €17.50 per month, as of 1 April 2015. These fees are not collected directly by the SWR but by the ARD ZDF Deutschlandradio Beitragsservice that is a common organisation of ARD, its members, ZDF and Deutschlandradio.

In 2016, the SWR received over €1,000,000,000 from these fees, out of nearly €8,000,000,000 collected in total that year.

== Studios and offices ==
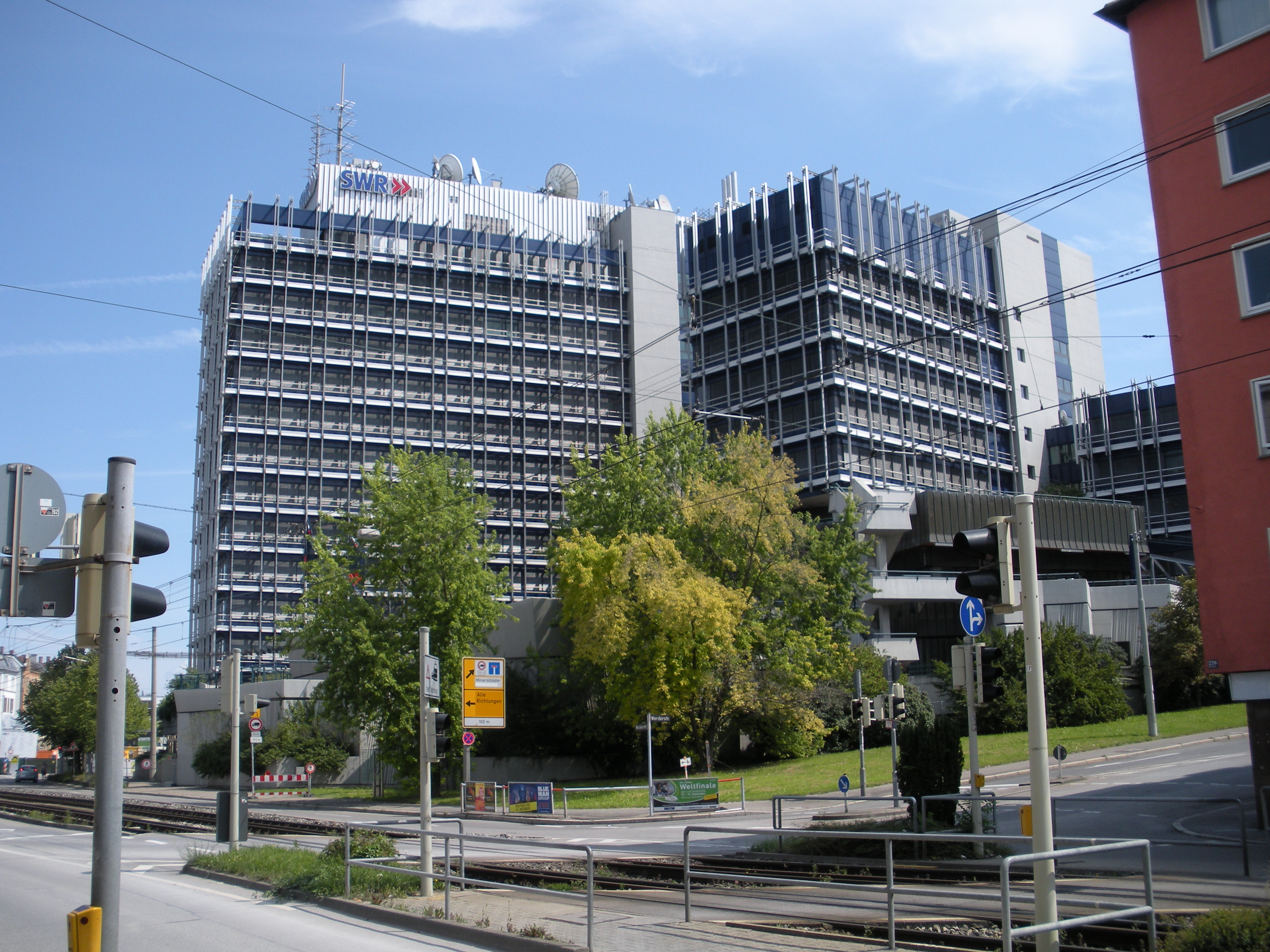
Headquarters in Stuttgart

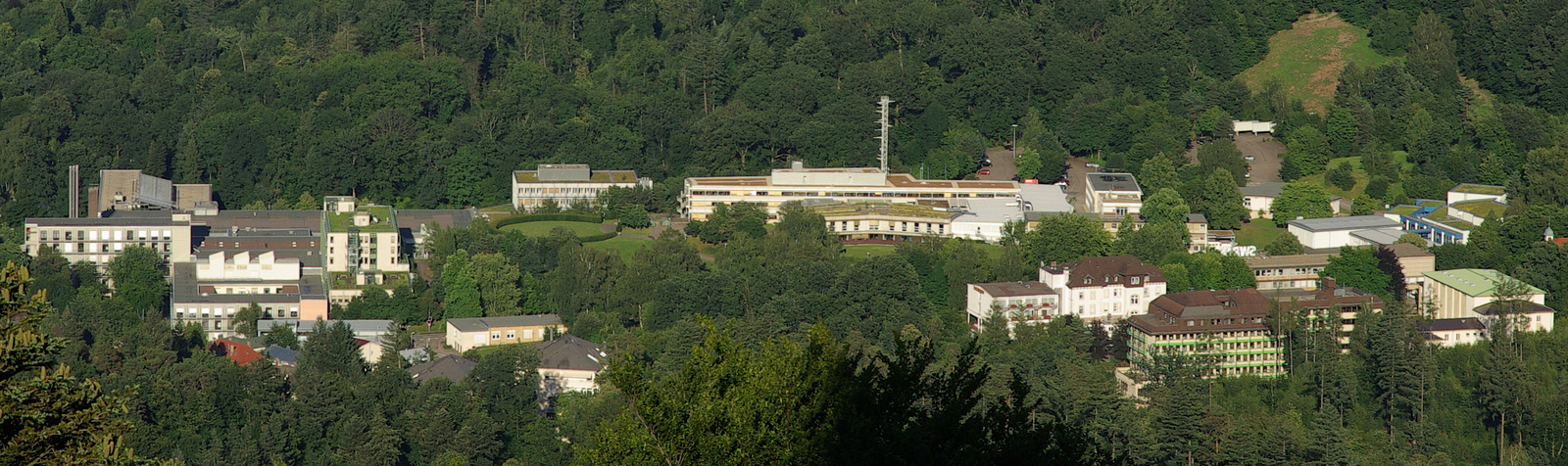
SWR buildings in Baden-Baden

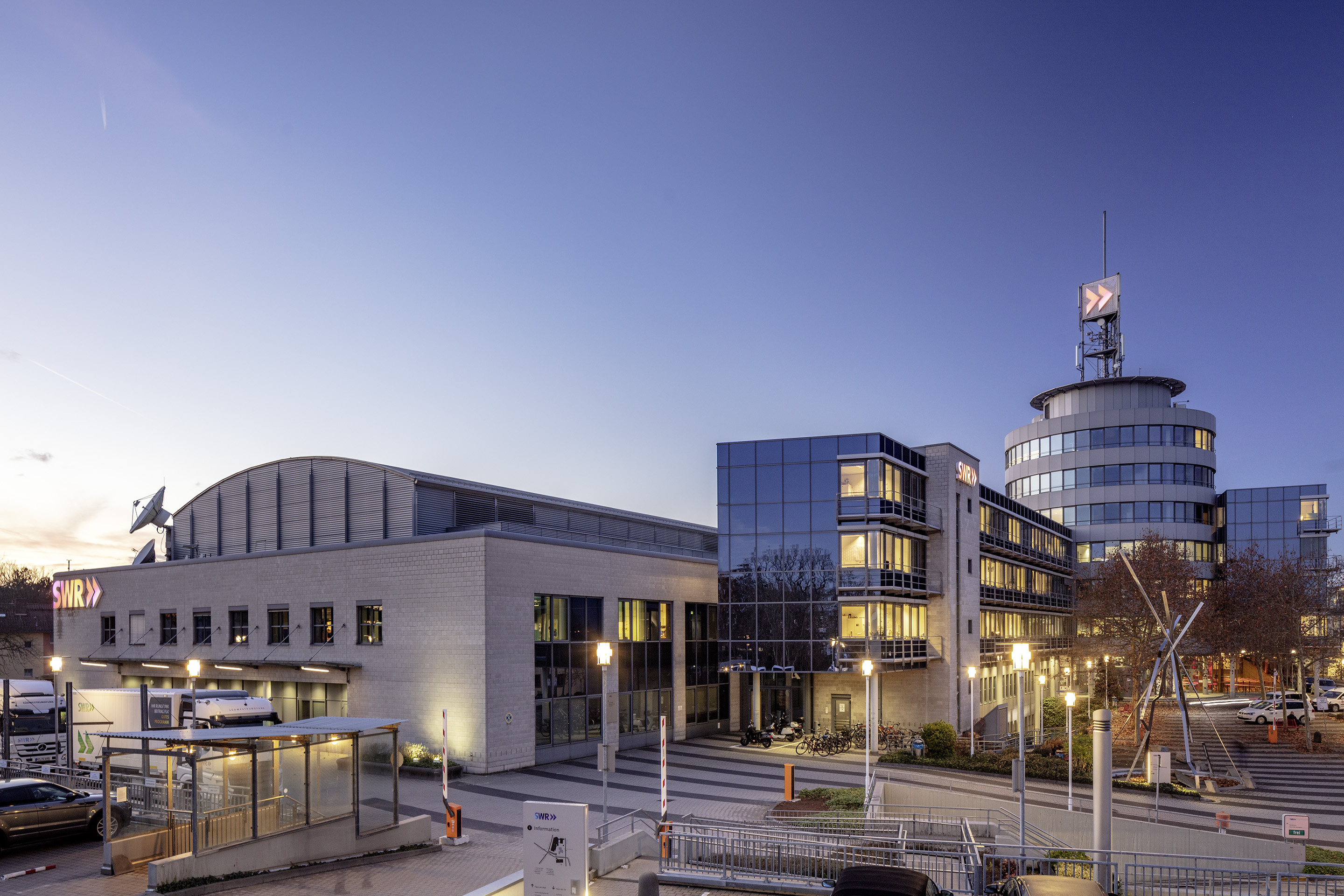
Funkhaus Mainz

SWR operates studios in the following cities:

- in Baden-Württemberg: Baden-Baden, Stuttgart, Freiburg im Breisgau, Friedrichshafen, Heilbronn, Karlsruhe, Mannheim, Tübingen and Ulm
- in Rhineland-Palatinate: Kaiserslautern, Koblenz, Mainz and Trier

SWR regional offices are in:

- in Baden-Württemberg: Lörrach, Offenburg and Villingen-Schwenningen
- in Rhineland-Palatinate: Bad Neuenahr-Ahrweiler, Betzdorf, Idar-Oberstein, Landau, Worms, Traben-Trarbach and Gerolstein.

In Baden-Württemberg there are also "Korrespondentenbüros" (roughly: "correspondence offices") for the SWR in Aalen, Albstadt-Ebingen, Biberach, Buchen, Konstanz, Mosbach, Pforzheim, Ravensburg, Schwäbisch Hall, Tauberbischofsheim and Waldshut-Tiengen.

== Programming ==
SWR provides programs to various TV and radio networks, some done in collaboration with other broadcasters, and others completely independently.

=== Television channels ===
- Das Erste "Erstes Deutsches Fernsehen" (German Television One) – Collaborative program for the ARD. SWR's portion is 16.95 percent. SWR also contributes to ARD digital, delivered over cable and satellite networks.
- SWR Fernsehen ("Unser Drittes") – ["SWR television – Our Third"] – The channel three network for Baden-Württemberg and the Rhineland-Palatinate. The programming is transmitted in two different versions, one for Baden-Württemberg and one for the Rhineland-Palatinate. The Saarländischer Rundfunk (SR, Saarland Broadcasting) retransmits over 70 percent of these programs under the banner "SR Fernsehen" ("SR Television).
- Phoenix – Collaborative network programming between the ARD and ZDF.
- KiKA – Children's network from ARD and ZDF.
- arte – Franco-German cultural network
- 3sat – Cultural network from ARD, ZDF, ORF (Austrian Broadcasting), and SRG (Swiss Broadcasting).
- EinsPlus - former network that existed from 1997 to 2016

=== Radio channels ===
SWR operates six radio channels on FM and DAB, all of which are also streamed on the internet.

- SWR1 (Eins gehört gehört – SWR1): plays international pop and rock music from 1960–1990, European pop music, German pop and a limited number of contemporary hits to a target audience of adults aged 30–55, in two regional versions:
  - SWR1 Baden-Württemberg
  - SWR1 Rheinland-Pfalz
- SWR Kultur (Kultur neu entdecken): speech-based radio, including features, radio plays, and readings, plus classical music and jazz. Known as SWR2 until 15 April 2024.
- SWR3 (Einfach SWR3): plays pop and contemporary music to a target audience of 14- to 39-year-olds.
- SWR4 (Da sind wir daheim): plays German hits and "oldies" in two regional versions, each with local and sub-local opt-outs at specified times daily:
  - SWR4 Baden-Württemberg
    - Baden Radio (Karlsruhe)
    - Bodensee Radio (Friedrichshafen)
    - Franken Radio (Heilbronn)
    - Kurpfalz Radio (Mannheim)
    - Radio Stuttgart (Stuttgart)
    - Radio Südbaden (Freiburg)
      - Hochrhein Radio (Lörrach)
      - Ortenau Radio (Offenburg)
      - Radio Breisgau (Freiburg)
      - Radio Schwarzwald-Baar-Heuberg (Villingen-Schwenningen)
    - Radio Tübingen (Tübingen)
    - Schwaben Radio (Ulm)
  - SWR4 Rheinland-Pfalz
    - Radio Kaiserslautern (Kaiserslautern)
    - Radio Koblenz (Koblenz)
    - Radio Ludwigshafen (Ludwigshafen)
    - Radio Mainz (Mainz)
    - Radio Trier (Trier)
- DASDING (Live. Laut. Lässig.): youth-oriented programming.
- SWR Aktuell: news, topical talk, and coverage of current affairs.
- SWR cont.ra: news, politics, culture, entertainment and sports, replaced by SWRinfo (2002–2012)
- SWRinfo: news station replaced by SWR Aktuell (2012–2017)

== Organization ==
Since 2007, the managing director of SWR has been Peter Boudgoust, who was previously the administrative director of SWR. The managing director's office is located in Stuttgart. Seven other directors serve under him (locations of their offices in parentheses):

- Jan Büttner – Administration (Stuttgart)
- Dr. Christoph Hauser – Information, Sport, Film, Service & Entertainment (Baden-Baden)
- Gerold Hug – Culture, Knowledge, Young Formats (Baden-Baden)
- Stefanie Schneider – Regional Programming for Baden-Württemberg (Stuttgart)
- Dr. Simone Schelberg – Regional Programming for Rhineland-Palatinate (Mainz)
- Dr. Hermann Eicher – Legal Department (Mainz)
- Michael Eberhard – Engineering and Production (Baden-Baden)

== Transmitter locations ==
- Fernsehturm Stuttgart (Stuttgart TV Tower – a large TV/radio transmission tower in a steel-reinforced concrete structure, also containing a tower restaurant and viewing deck)
- Rheinsender at Wolfsheim for FM
- Fernsehturm Heidelberg (Heidelberg TV Tower – a large TV/radio transmission tower in a steel-reinforced concrete structure, containing a viewing deck).
- Transmitter Aalen for FM and TV
- Transmitter Waldenburg for FM and TV
- Transmitter Bad Mergentheim-Löffelstelzen for FM and TV
- Transmitter Ulm-Kuhberg for VHF
- Transmitter Freiburg-Lehen for FM and TV
- Transmitter Ulm-Ermingen for FM and TV
- Transmitter Hornisgrinde for FM and TV
- Transmitter Raichberg for FM and TV
- Transmitter Wannenberg for FM and TV
- Transmitter Blauen for FM and TV
- Transmitter Bad Marienberg for FM and TV
- Transmitter Fernsehturm St. Chrischona (Switzerland) for FM and TV
- Transmitter Feldberg im Schwarzwald for FM and TV
- Transmitter Weinbiet for FM and TV
- Transmitter Haardtkopf for FM and TV
- Transmitter Kettrichhof for FM and TV
- Transmitter Witthoh for FM and TV
- Transmitter Saarburg for FM and TV
- Transmitter Potzberg for FM and TV
- Transmitter Eifel for FM and TV
- Transmitter Waldburg for FM and TV
- Transmitter Dieblich-Naßheck (Koblenz) for FM and TV
- Transmitter Donnersberg for FM and TV
- Transmitter Linz am Rhein for FM and TV
- Transmitter Grünten im Allgäu for FM

== Orchestras and choruses ==
SWR operates the following musical organizations:

- "SWR Symphony Orchestra Baden-Baden and Freiburg" – an orchestra with a rich tradition dating back to its establishment in 1946. Formerly the SWF Symphony Orchestra in Baden-Baden. Past chief conductors included Hans Rosbaud and Ernest Bour. The Orchestra is best known through the Donaueschingen Festival for new music.
- "Radio Symphony Orchestra Stuttgart of the SWR" in Stuttgart. Also originally organized in 1946, this was the former SDR Radio Symphony Orchestra. A former major chief conductor was Hans Müller-Kray. The Orchestra was best known through its festival appearances in Schwetzingen.
- "SWR Vocal Ensemble Stuttgart" – originally the "Southern Radio Chorus" Stuttgart, again dating from 1946.
- Deutsche Radio Philharmonie Saarbrücken Kaiserslautern – which merged in 1973 from the Rundfunkorchester Kaiserslautern and the Rundfunk-Sinfonieorchester Saarbrücken.
- "SWR Big Band" – originally the "Southern Radio Dance Orchestra", also organized in 1951, and was led for many years by Erwin Lehn.
- "SWR 3 Band" – a cover band in which several announcers of SWR3 play (e.g. Stefanie Tücking, Michael Spleth and Jan Garcia).
- "SWR 4 Band" – a cover band in which several music editors of SWR4 Baden-Württemberg [Radio Stuttgart] play (e.g. Wolfgang Gutmann, Rolf-Dieter Fröschlin, Helmut Link, Karlheinz Link and Peter Schönfeld).

== Responsibilities within the ARD ==
Within the ARD, SWR is responsible for the coordination of the joint network programming on the networks 3sat and arte as well as the main Internet site for the ARD, ARD.de. The offices for ARTE Deutschland TV GmbH are in Baden-Baden, and the offices for ARD.de are in Mainz.

SWR is also responsible for some of the foreign studios operated on behalf of the ARD:

- ARD-Studio Algiers (Algeria, Morocco, Tunisia)
- ARD-Studio Buenos Aires (Argentina, Bolivia, Brazil, Chile, Paraguay, Peru, Uruguay)
- ARD-Studio Geneva (covering the Geneva offices of the United Nations, as well as Switzerland and Liechtenstein)
- ARD-Studio Johannesburg (Angola, Botswana, Lesotho, Mozambique, Namibia, Zimbabwe, South Africa, Eswatini)
- ARD-Studio Cairo (Egypt, Iraq, Yemen, Jordan, Qatar, Kuwait, Lebanon, Libya, Oman, Saudi Arabia, Sudan, Syria, United Arab Emirates)
- ARD-Studio Mexico City (Anguilla, Antigua and Barbuda, Aruba, Bahamas, Barbados, Belize, Costa Rica, Dominica, Dominican Republic, Ecuador, El Salvador, Grenada, Guadeloupe, Guatemala, Haiti, Jamaica, Virgin Islands, Cayman Islands, Colombia, Cuba, Martinique, Mexico, Montserrat, Nicaragua, Netherlands Antilles, Panama, Puerto Rico, St. Kitts and Nevis, St. Lucia, St. Vincent and the Grenadines, Suriname, Trinidad and Tobago, Turks and Caicos Islands, Venezuela)
- ARD-Studio Strasbourg/Straßburg (covering the offices of the European Union and the European Council)

== Subsidiaries of SWR ==
The following companies are subsidiaries of SWR-Holding GmbH:

- Südwest-Werbung GmbH – Advertising for radio and TV programs
- SWR Media GmbH – Licenses of SWR, including use of excerpts and sponsorships
- Südfunk Wirtschaftsbetriebe GmbH – Handles rent/leases for the "Parkhotel Stuttgart"
- Fernsehturm Betriebs GmbH – Responsible for the viewing deck and restaurant at the Fernsehturm Stuttgart
- Schwetzinger Festspiele GmbH – Responsible for the festival at Schwetzingen
- Maran-Film-GmbH – Film production company
- Bavaria Film GmbH – Film und TV production company
- Telepool GmbH – International management for productions of SWR and other public broadcasting services
- Der Audio Verlag GmbH – Production and management for audio recordings
- TR-Verlagsunion GmbH – Print publisher of various materials related to broadcasting
- Haus des Dokumentarfilms e. V. – Not-for-profit organization responsible for various documentaries

== See also ==
- Television in Germany
