= Bad Mergentheim =

- Town
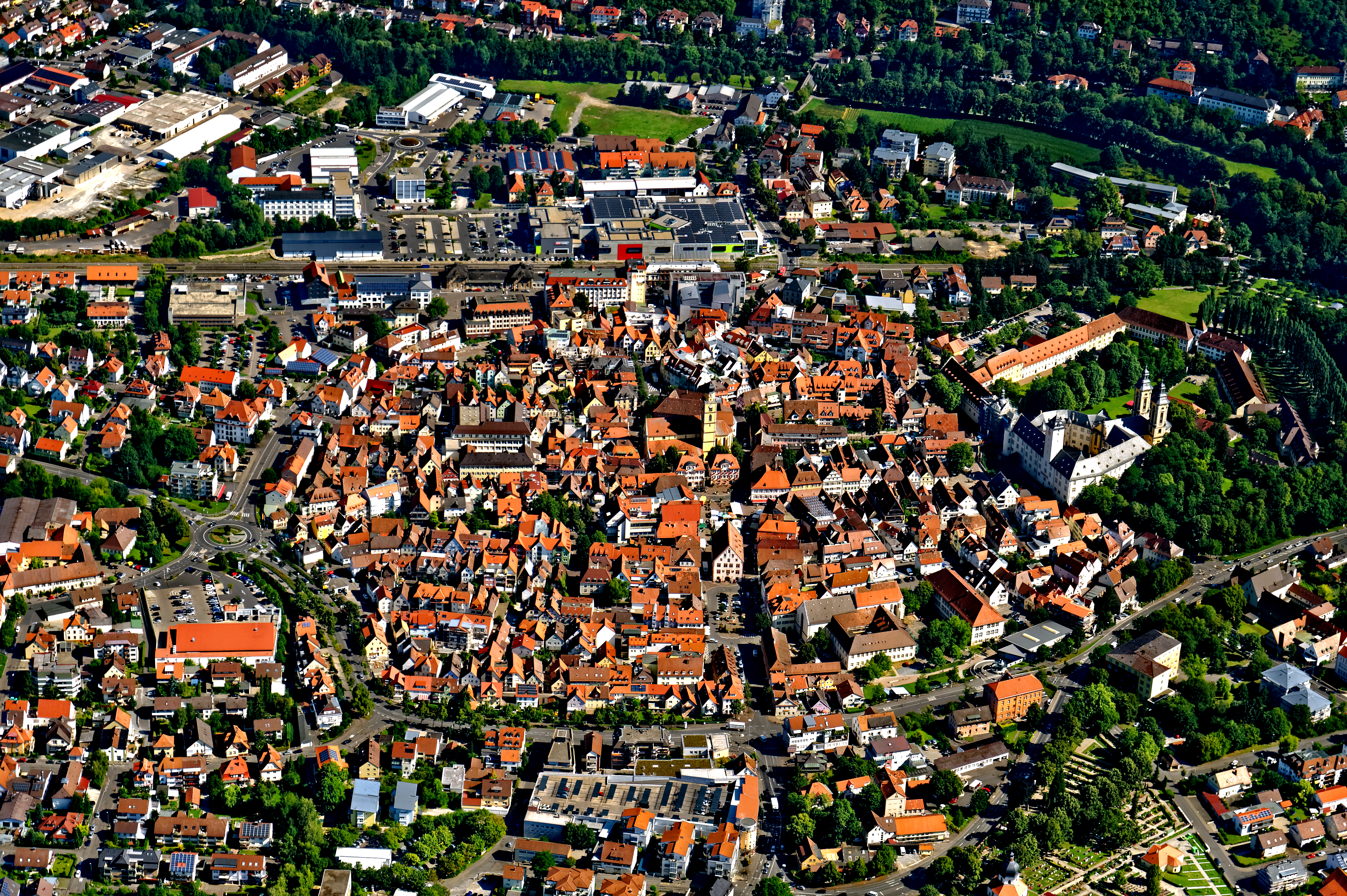
- Aerial Photo of Bad Mergentheim

- Coat of arms

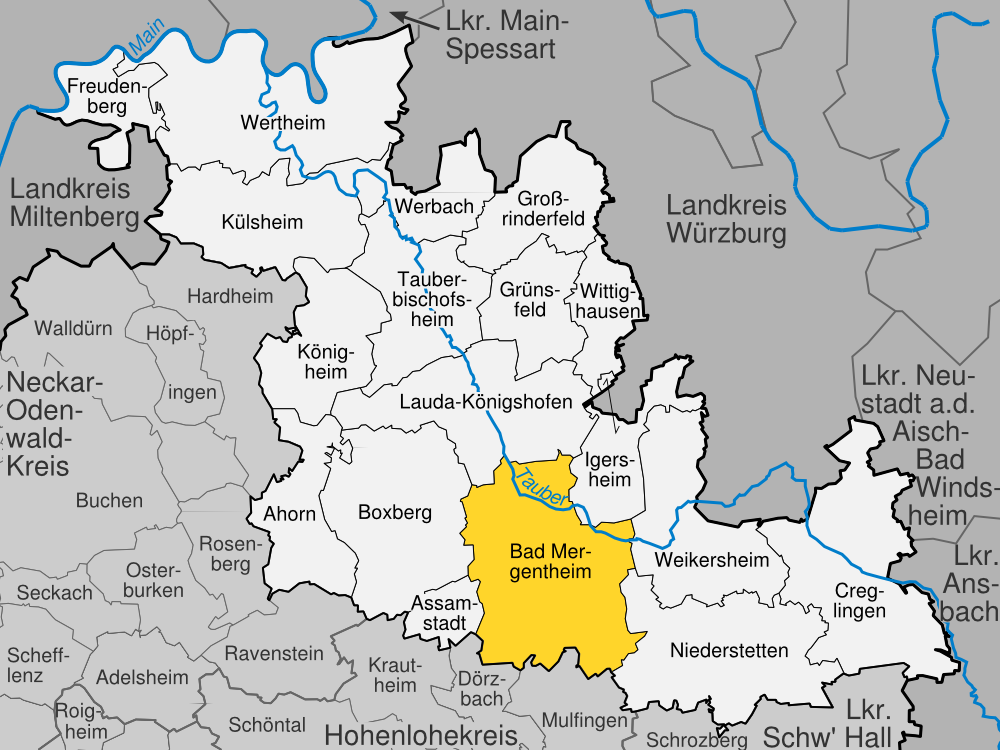
- Location of Bad Mergentheim within Main-Tauber-Kreis district
- Interactive map of Bad Mergentheim
- Location within Germany Location within Baden-Württemberg
- Coordinates: 49°29′27″N 9°46′23″E
- Country: Germany
- State: Baden-Württemberg
- Admin. region: Stuttgart
- District: Main-Tauber-Kreis
- Subdivisions: Kernstadt and 13 Stadtteile

Government
  - Mayor (2019–27): Udo Glatthaar (CDU)

Area
  - Total: 129.96 km^{2} (50.18 sq mi)
- Elevation: 206 m (676 ft)

Population (2025-12-31)
  - Total: 24,084
  - Density: 185.32/km^{2} (479.97/sq mi)
- Time zone: UTC+01:00 (CET)
  - Summer (DST): UTC+02:00 (CEST)
- Postal codes: 97980
- Dialling codes: 07931 (primarily), 07930, 07932, 07937, 07938 (boroughs)
- Vehicle registration: TBB, MGH
- Website: www.bad-mergentheim.de

Bad Mergentheim (German: [baːt ˈmɛʁɡn̩thaɪm]; Mergentheim until 1926; East Franconian: Märchedol) is a town in the Main-Tauber-Kreis district in the German state of Baden-Württemberg. It has a population of around 23,000. An officially recognized spa town since 1926, Bad Mergentheim is also known as the headquarters of the Teutonic Order from 1526 until 1809.

== Geography ==
=== Subdivisions ===
Since administrative reform in the 1970s the following villages have been part of the municipality: Althausen (pop. 600), Apfelbach (350), Dainbach (370), Edelfingen (1,400; birthplace of the American biochemist Julius Adler), Hachtel (360), Herbsthausen (200), Löffelstelzen (1,000), Markelsheim (2,000), Neunkirchen (1,000), Rengershausen (480), Rot (260), Stuppach (680), Wachbach (1,300)

== History ==
Mergentheim is mentioned in chronicles as early as 1058, as the residence of the family of the counts of Hohenlohe. The brothers Andreas, Heinrich and Friedrich von Hohenlohe joined the Deutscher Orden (Teutonic Order) in 1219 and gave their two castles near Mergentheim to the order. One was abandoned, the other became the seat of the local Komtur (commander) of the order.

Following the Order's conquest of East Prussia and part of Livland in the 1230s, in 1309 the Grand Master of the order moved to the Marienburg. In 1340 Mergentheim was awarded town privileges. It rapidly became the most important of the eleven commanderies of the Teutonic Order. The Deutschmeister, highest ranking member inside the Holy Roman Empire (to which Prussia did not belong), moved his seat to Mergentheim in 1525 after his castle at Hornberg/Neckar had been destroyed by peasants. That same year, Grand Master Albrecht von Zollern-Brandenburg resigned his position, left the order, introduced Reformation, married and – supported by his liege lord the King of Poland – turned the order's eastern territories into a temporal duchy. The rulers of the order in Germany, now styling themselves Hoch- und Deutschmeister, then made Mergentheim the order's new headquarters and expanded the castle into a palatial residence.

Over the next centuries, the town served as the centre of the order's southern German territories much like the residence town of any ruling prince. Some grand masters, like Archduke Leopold Wilhelm of Austria (1614–62), who in his 21 years in that role never once set foot in the town, were hardly ever present. Others, like Maximilian Franz (1756–1801), a son of Maria Theresa, loved the place. For the order's general chapter in 1791 he brought the orchestra of the Archbishopric of Cologne, including one Ludwig van Beethoven on viola. Mergentheim retained this role until the dissolution of the order in the countries of the Rheinbund in 1809 by Napoleon.

Mergentheim's fortunes declined after that but were reversed in 1826, when a shepherd by the name of Franz Gehring discovered rich mineral springs in the surrounding area, during the time when spas were expanding in Germany at a rapid pace. The water turned out to be the strongest sodium-sulfate water in Europe, reportedly effective for the treatment of digestive disorders.

In the 1970s during the Gemeindereform (administrative reform) several neighbouring villages were incorporated into the municipality.

== Arts and culture ==
=== Attractions ===
==== Mergentheim Palace ====
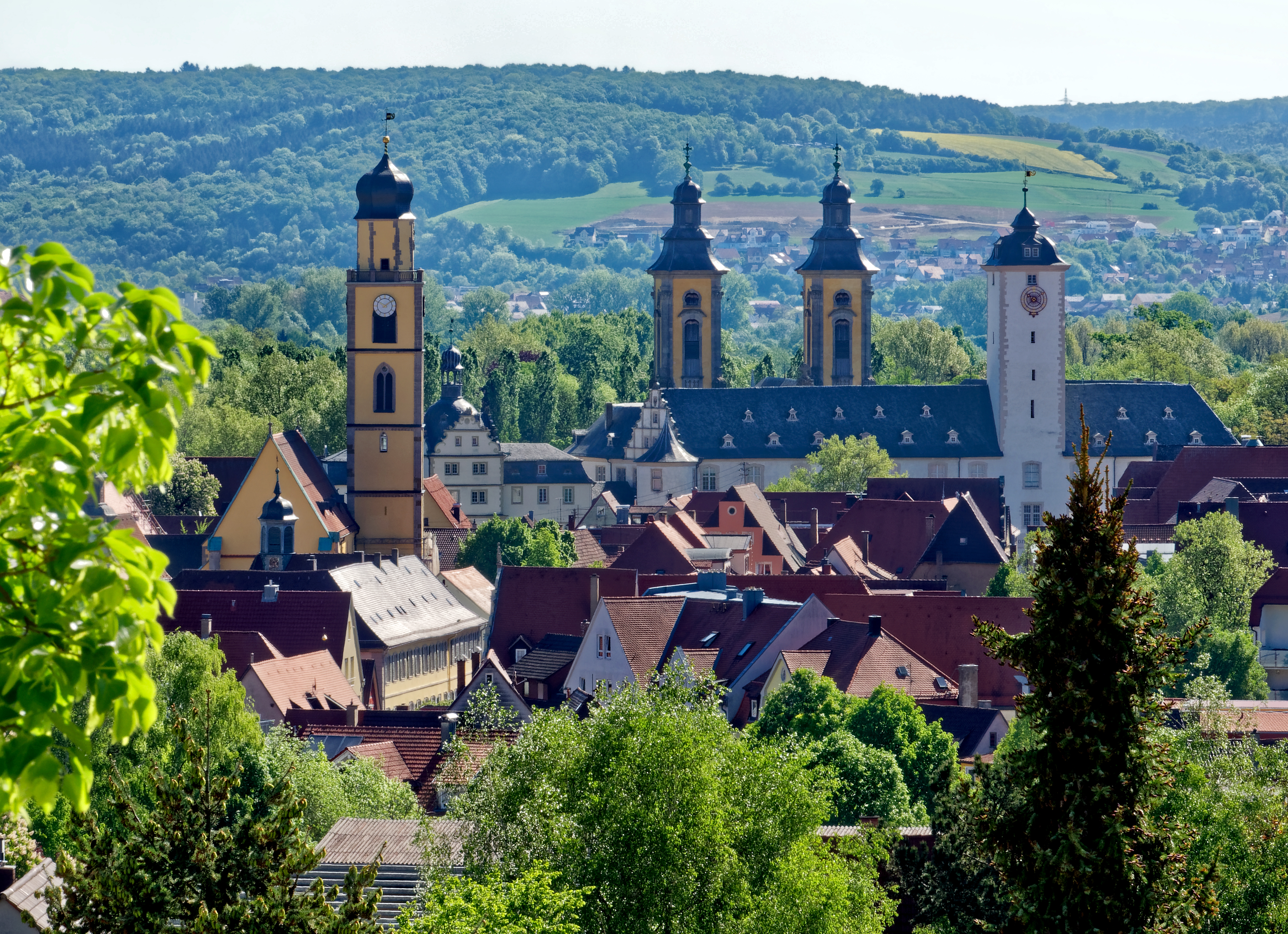
The towers of Bad Mergentheim

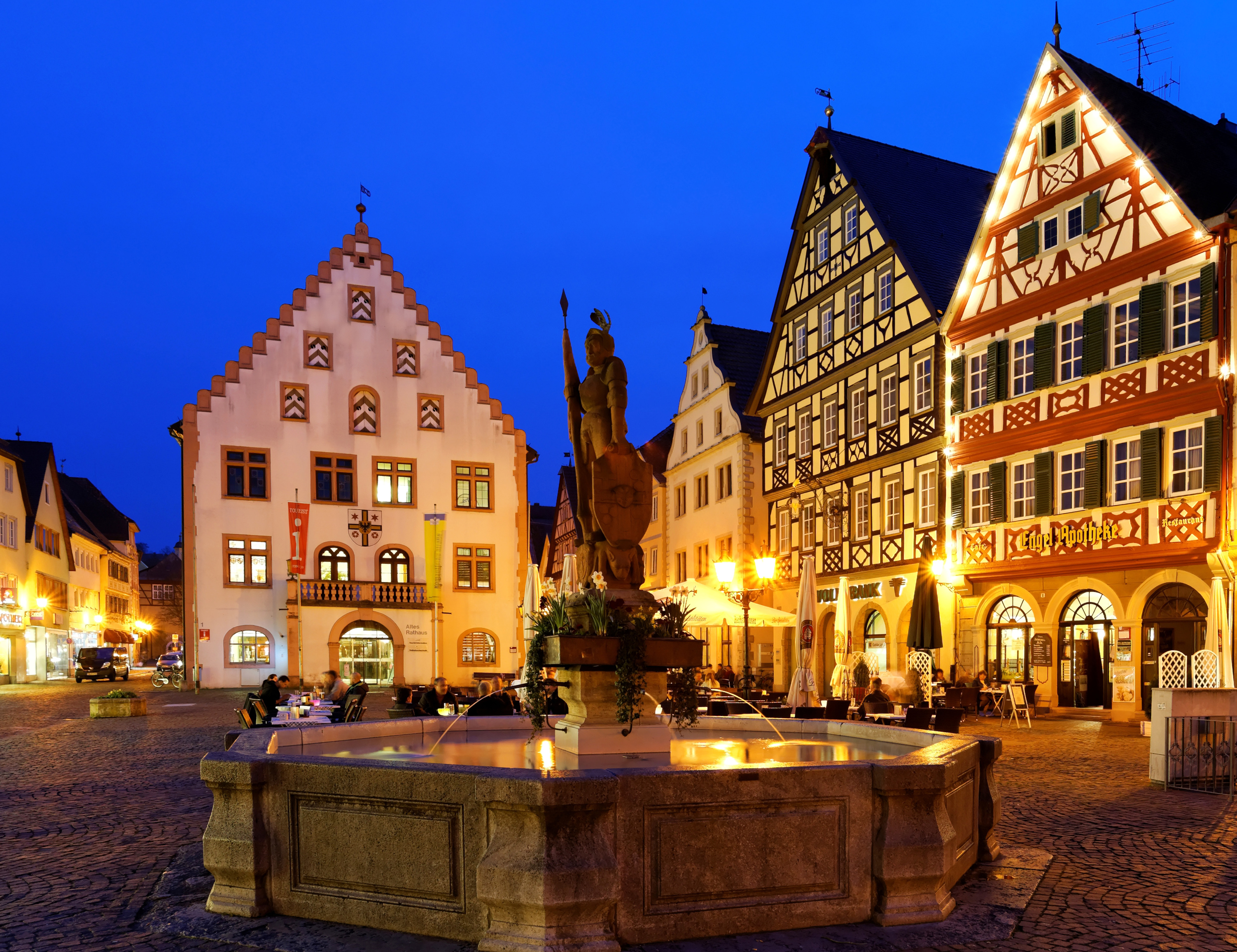
The old town hall and market place in Bad Mergentheim

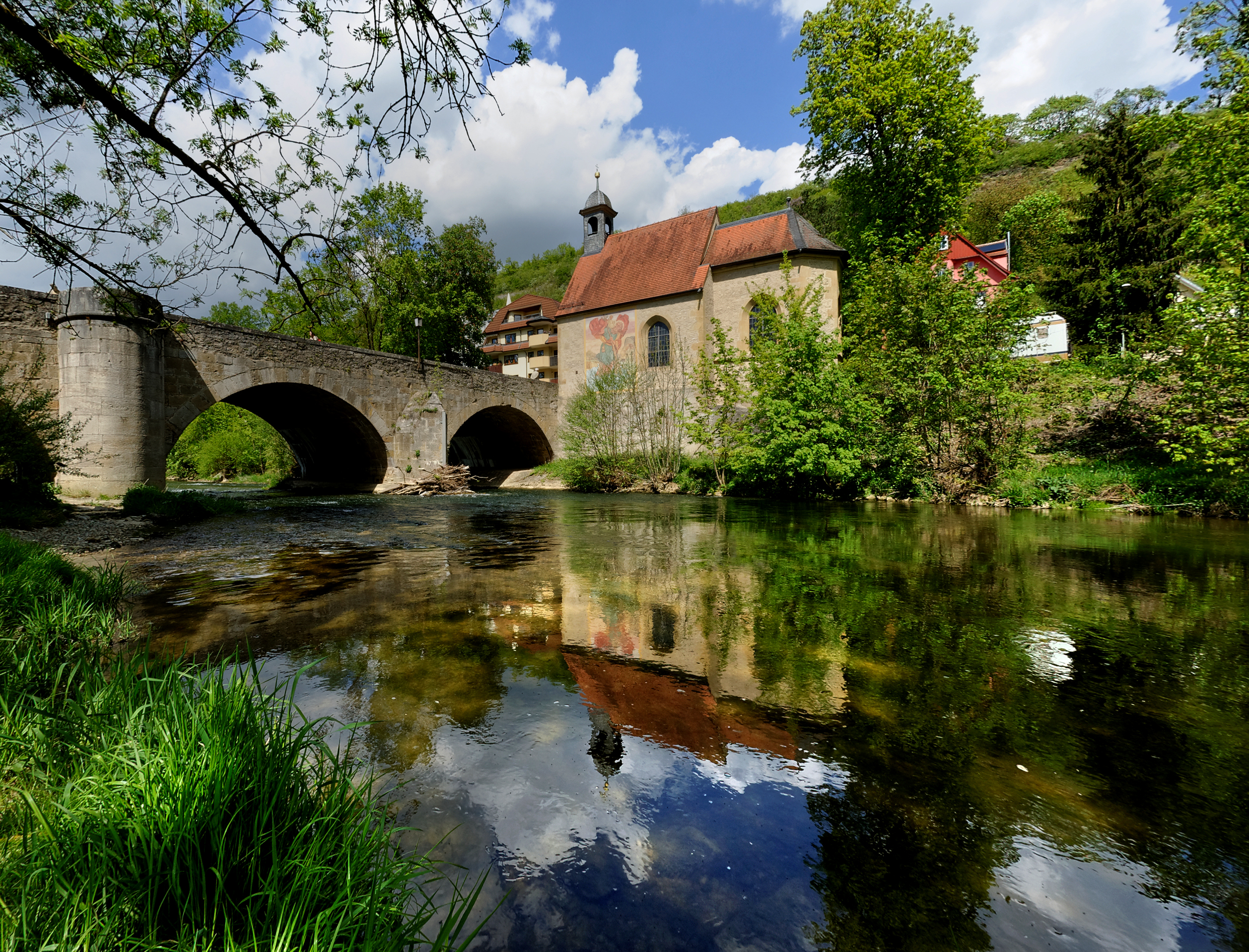
The Wolfgang chapel and stone bridge over the Tauber

The best-known sight of Bad Mergentheim is the Deutschordensschloss or Mergentheim Palace, the castle where the Teutonic Knights once had their home base. It is a complex of buildings built over a period of eight hundred years. The first buildings of the castle were probably erected as early as the 12th century. The castle was expanded in the late 16th century under Grand Master Walther von Cronberg. Over the course of time a representative Renaissance complex was built by connecting the individual buildings in the inner palace courtyard to a closed ring of buildings. In 1574, the main architect, Blasius Berwart, also constructed the spiral staircase between the west and north wing. Today the castle houses the Deutschordensmuseum (museum of the Teutonic Order).

The English landscape garden between palace and spa building is mainly due to Archduke Maximilian Franz. In 1797, he had a "mosque" built there to recall the past Turkish threat and in 1802 the Schellenhäusle, a late Chinoiserie. The obelisk was built under Duke Paul von Württemberg, a memorial for a dog that saved his life on one of his expeditions.

The castle complex is dominated by the Schlosskirche (palace church), begun in 1730 under Franz Ludwig Herzog von Pfalz-Neuburg in Baroque style. It was finished in 1735 under Clemens August von Wittelsbach. The plans for the interior were drawn up by François de Cuvilliés, the Electoral court architect of Cologne. Architects working on site were Joseph Roth and Friedrich Kirchenmayer. Its Rococo interior features elaborate ceiling frescos by the court painter Nikolaus Gottfried Stuber, depicting The Defense of Faith, the Glorification of the Cross in Heaven and on Earth and the Emperor Constantine's Vision of the Cross. The main altar painting is Die Salbung Jesu durch Maria in Bethanien by local painter Matthäus Zehender. Side altar paintings were by Giambattista Pittoni (Kreuzaufnahme, Armenspeisung durch die heilige Elisabeth). The crypt below the church is the burial site of the order's grand masters. For around 200 years the Schlosskirche has been a Protestant church.

==== Other sights ====
The sacristy of the Marienkirche (finished in 1388) features frescos made in 1300–10 by the monk Rudolfus. This was formerly the church of a Dominican monastery. The cloister has a fresco from 1486 showing a Visitation that depicts an embryo inside the body of Mary. The church also contains the epitaph of Walther von Cronberg, the first Mergentheim Grand Master. Modelled in 1539, probably by Hans Vischer, it was taken to Monrepos at Ludwigsburg in 1809, when Mergentheim became part of the Kingdom of Württemberg. In 1853, the statue was restored to this church.

Ottmar Mergenthaler Museum

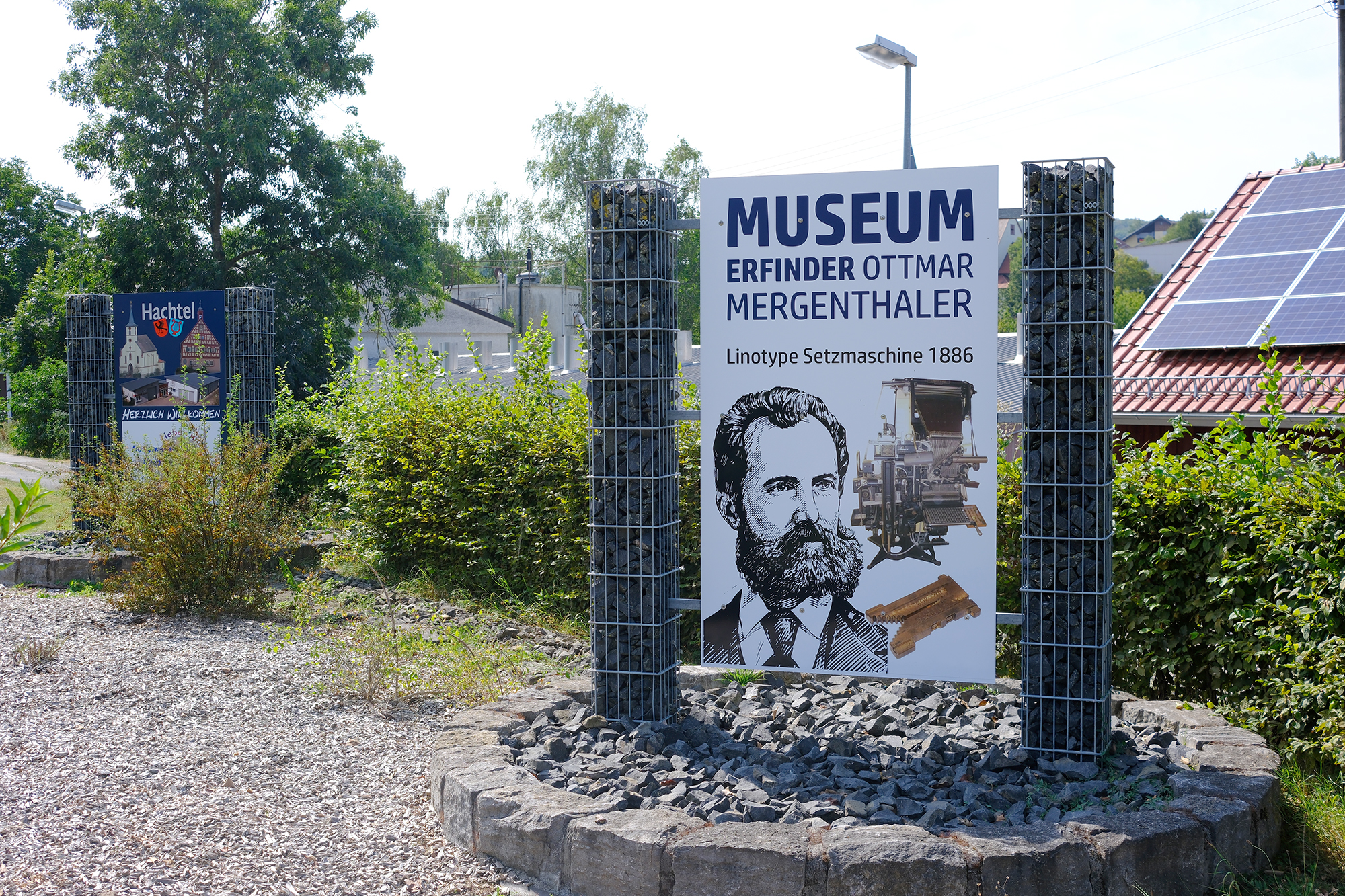
Signage on the edge of Hachtel advertising the Ottmar Mergenthaler Inventor Museum

In Hachtel, the Ottmar Mergenthaler Museum is located in the old town hall building on Ottmar-Mergenthaler-Straße, which was the birthplace of Ottmar Mergenthaler. The building was re-built in 1954 to celebrate the 100th birth date of the inventor by the Mergenthaler Setzmaschinen-Fabrik company of Germany. Today, the museum hosts guest to view their working Linotype machine on the ground level with artifacts of Ottmar Mergenthaler's life and invention and another Linotype machine on the second level. It is only open the first Sunday of every month, so planning your visit in advance is advised.

== Demographics ==
Year	Population
1660	1,064
1855	2,917
1900	4,372
1933	6,191
1945	9,300
1950	10,184
1961	11,608
1975	19,895
1990	21,567
2005	22,486
2013	22,470

== Governance ==
=== Town twinning ===
Bad Mergentheim is twinned with:

- Digne-les-Bains, France
- Sainte-Marie-du-Mont, Manche, France
- Fuefuki, Yamanashi, Japan
- Borgomanero, Italy

== Infrastructure ==
- Löffelstelzen Transmitter
- German Diabetes Center Mergentheim

== Notable people ==
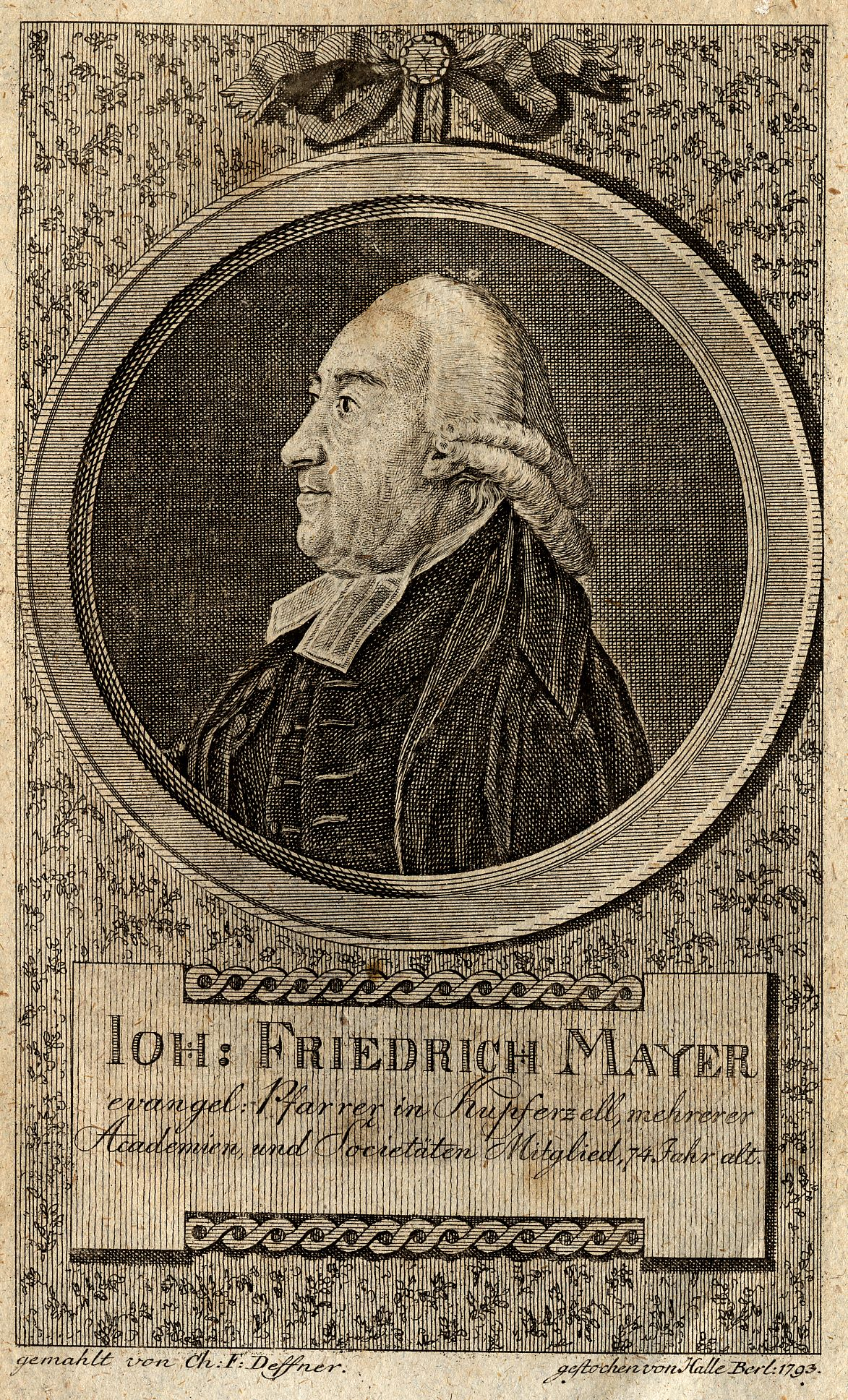
Johann Friedrich Mayer, 1793

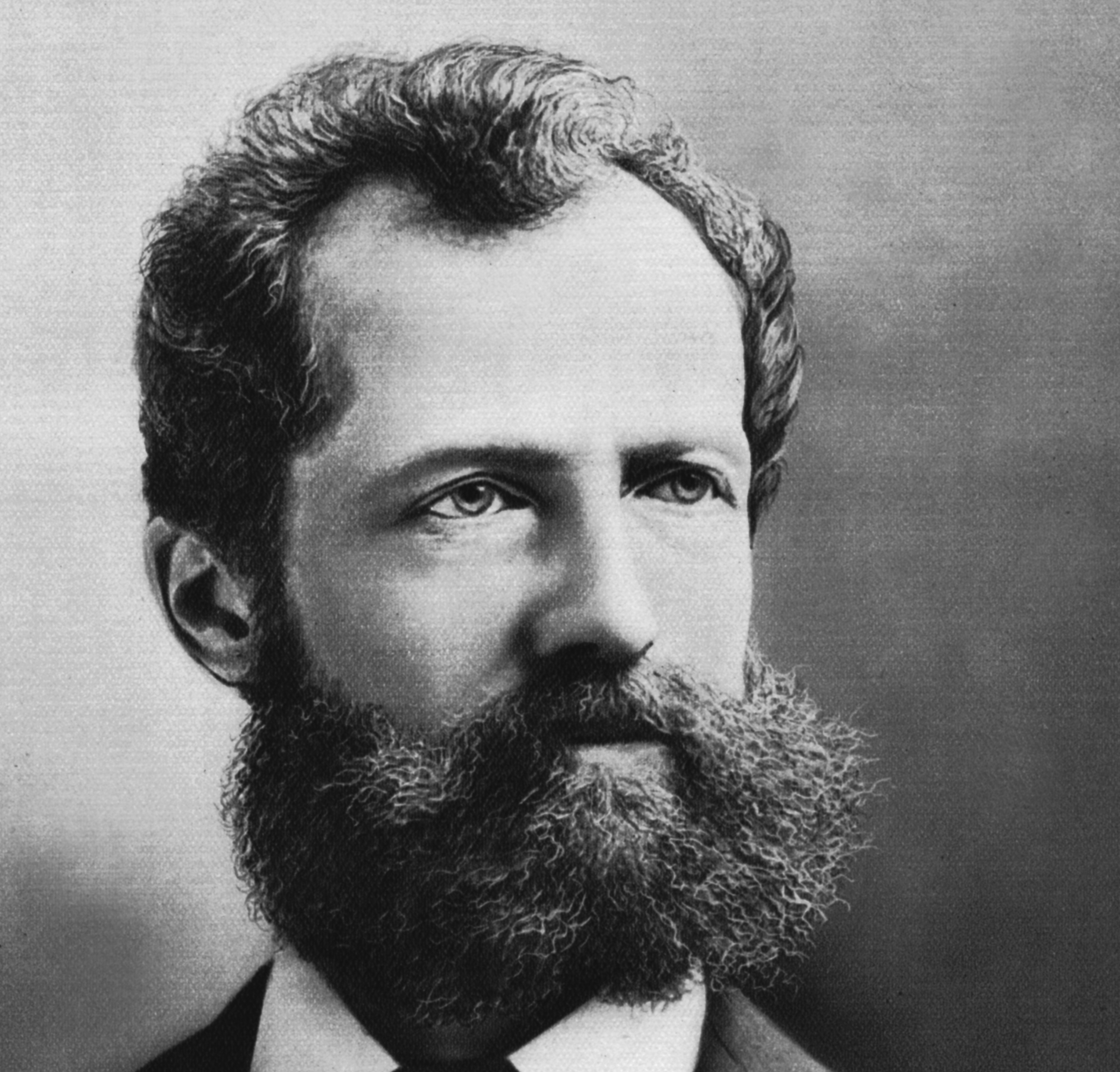
Ottmar Mergenthaler

- Heinrich von Hohenlohe (died 1249), nobleman, the seventh Grand Master of the Teutonic Order from 1244 to 1249, buried in the local church
- Johann Friedrich Mayer (1719–1798), priest and agricultural reformer ("Plaster Apostle")
- Ludwig van Beethoven (1770–1827), was viola player in the court's musical establishment of the Grand Master of the Teutonic Order, Maximilian Franz of Austria in 1791
- Carl Arnold (1794–1873), pianist, composer, conductor, teacher and organist
- Hermann Bauer (Pfarrer) (1814–1872), Protestant pastor and Württemberg local historian
- Eduard Mörike (1804–1875), German poet, lived in Mergentheim from 1844–1851
- Wilhelm Zimmermann (1807–1878), German theologian, historian and vegetarian, died in Mergentheim
- John Balbach (1820–1896), American emigrant, blacksmith and prominent citizen of San Jose, California
- Franz Conrad von Hötzendorf (1852–1925), Austro-Hungarian Field Marshall from 1871–1918, died in Mergentheim.
- Ottmar Mergenthaler (1854–1899), inventor of the Linotype
- Edvard Hjelt (1855–1921), Finnish chemist and politician, died in Mergentheim
- Felix Fechenbach (1894–1933), German-Jewish journalist, poet, political activist; murdered by the Nazis
- Julius Adler (1930–2024), biochemist and geneticist known for work on chemotaxis
- Hansgünther Heyme (born 1935), theatre director and figure in the Regietheater movement.
- Gudrun Mebs (born 1944), children's and youth book author (Jugendliteraturpreis 1984)
- Barbara Stamm (1944–2022), politician CSU, President of the Landtag of Bavaria
- Fritz Kuhn (born 1955), mayor of Stuttgart, former MP and former national chairman of the Greens
- Jürgen Koch (Koch) (born 1963), cook, awarded one star in the Michelin Guide

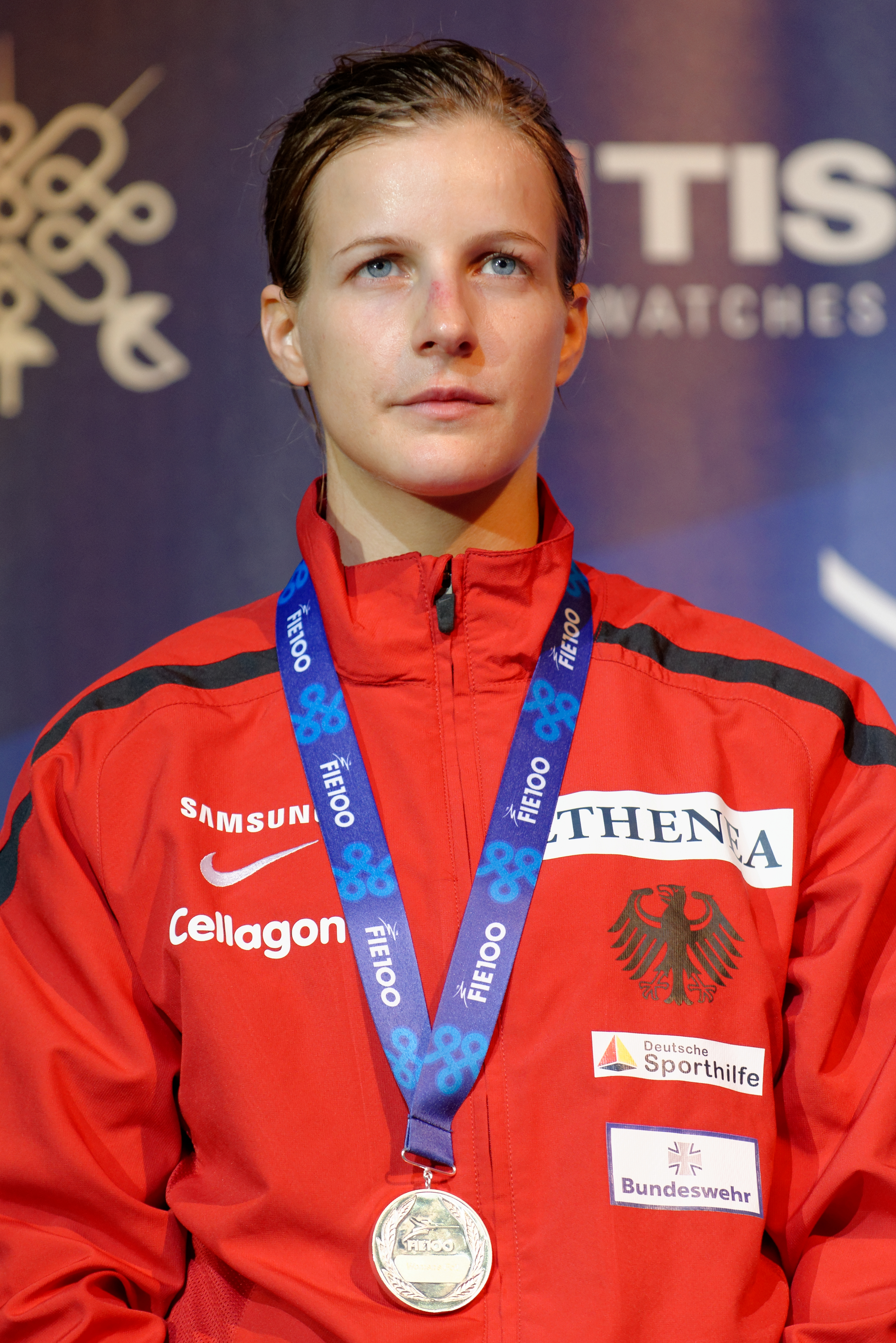
Carolin Golubytskyi, 2013

=== Sport ===
- Martin Lanig (born 1984), football player, played 259 games
- Carolin Golubytskyi (born 1985), foil fencer
- Christopher Bieber (born 1989), footballer who has played over 375 games
- Atilla Yildirim (born 1990), Dutch-Turkish football player, played over 175 games
- Luca Pfeiffer (born 1996), footballer who has played over 275 games
- Valentin Kluss (born 2007), racing driver

== See also ==
- Wildpark Bad Mergentheim
