= Bad Mergentheim Wildlife Park =

German zoo

Wildpark Bad Mergentheim

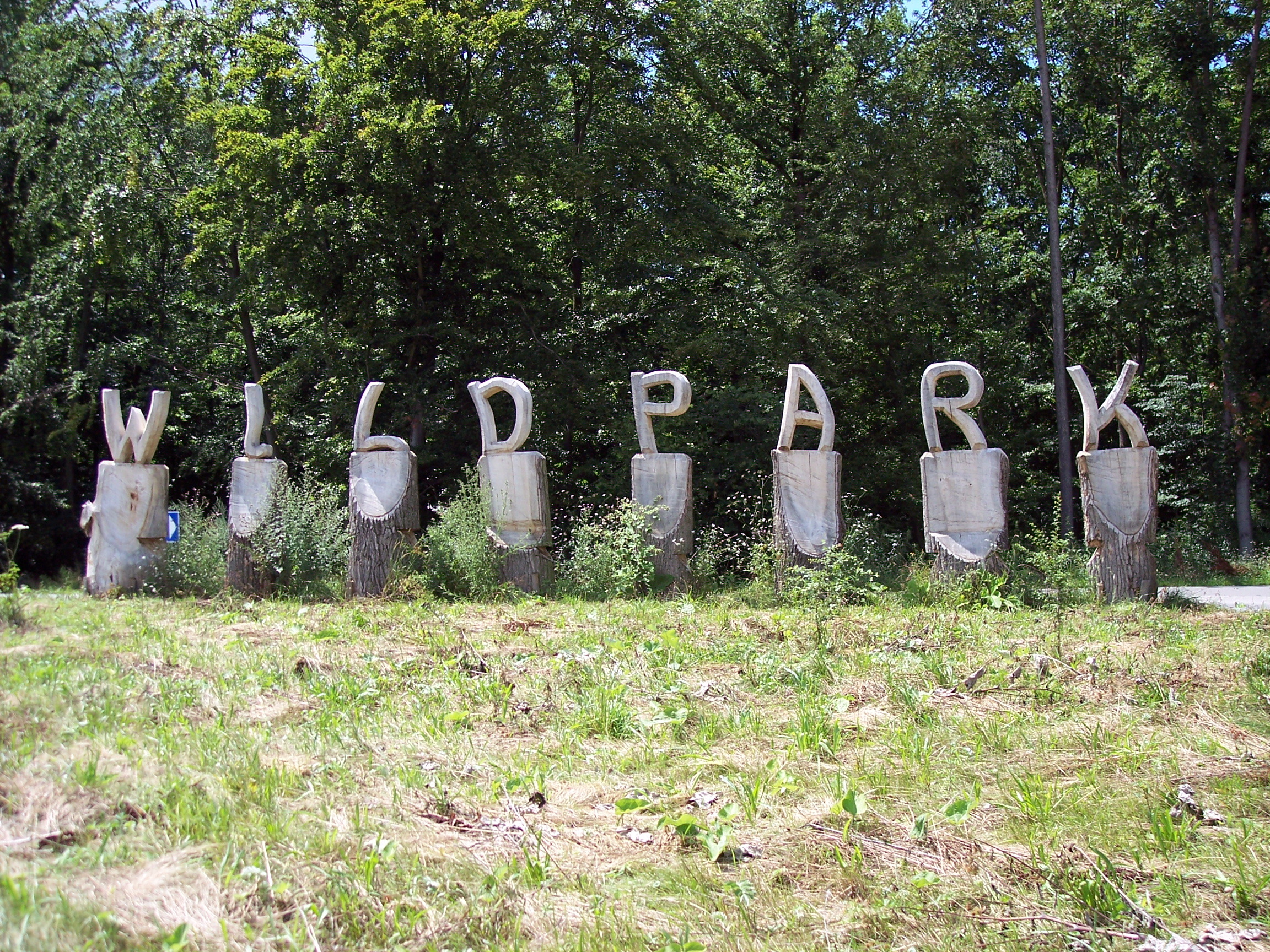
- Park entrance
- Interactive map of Wildpark Bad Mergentheim
- 49°28′06″N 9°47′49″E
- Date opened: 1973
- Location: Bad Mergentheim, Germany
- Land area: 35 hectares (86 acres)
- Website: www.wildtierpark.de/en/

The Wildpark Bad Mergentheim is a zoo that was founded in 1973. The 35-hectare (86-acre) park is located on a hill in the forest about 1.5 km (0.93 mi) southeast of Bad Mergentheim.

The park features a variety of wild fauna indigenous to the region, as well as domesticated animals such as cattle, goats, and horses.
