= Löffelstelzen radio transmitter =

Broadcasting Facility In Germany

Coordinates: 49°30′30″N 9°47′01″E

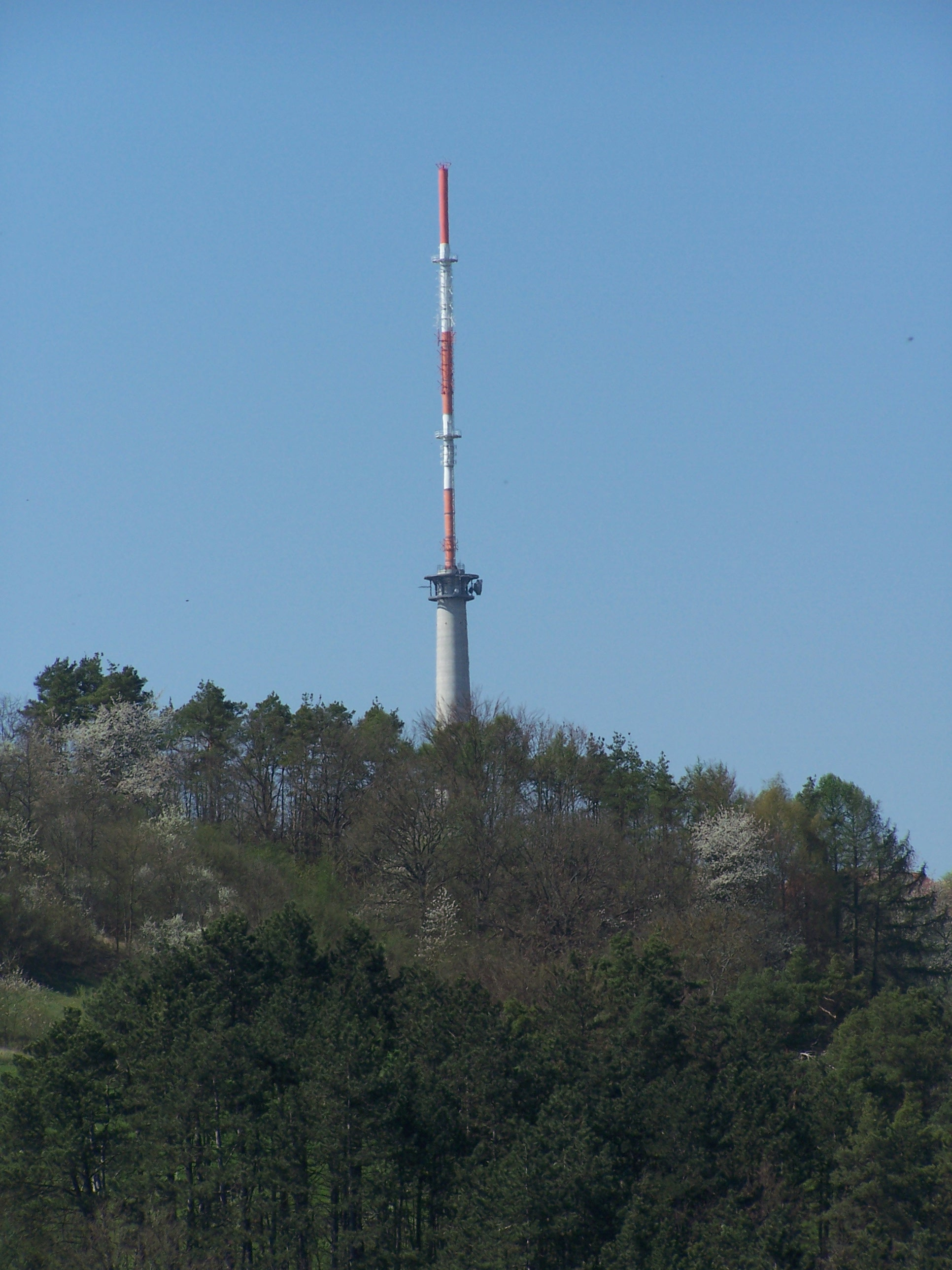
Löffelstelzen Transmitter

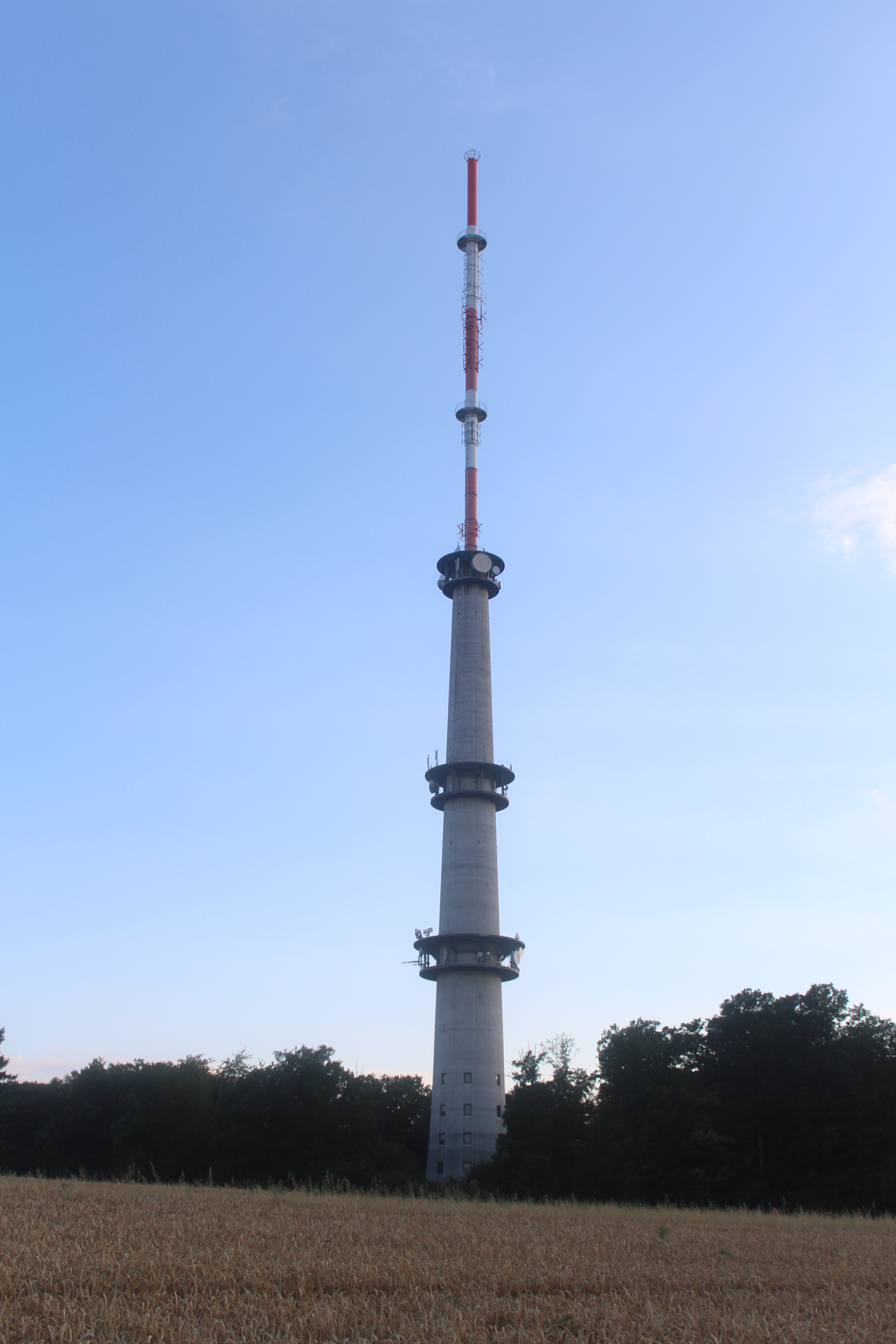
Sender Bad Mergentheim tower

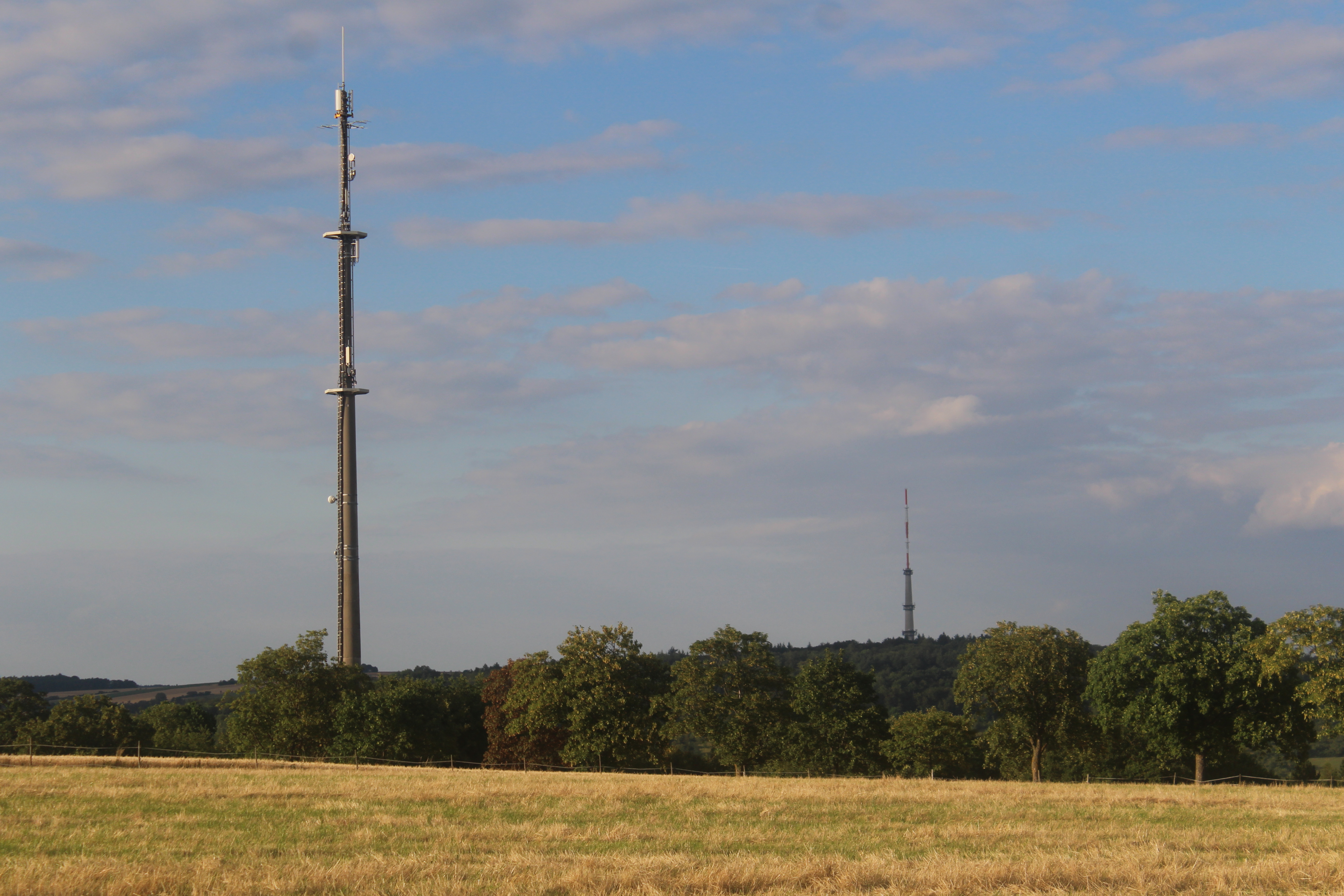
Drillbergturm

Löffelstelzen Transmitter is a broadcasting facility of SWR at Bad Mergentheim-Löffelstelzen in northern Baden-Württemberg, Germany. It was inaugurated at the beginning of the 1950s and used at those days a guyed mast, which was insulated against ground, because it was used for medium-wave broadcasting with a butterfly antenna for FM and TV transmission on its top. Later this mast was replaced by a concrete tower, which carried an antenna for FM/TV broadcasting on its top and a cage and a wire antenna for medium-wave broadcasting at its site. This tower was replaced between 1998 and 2000 by a 179-metre-tall (587 ft) concrete tower. This tower is not equipped with an antenna for medium-wave broadcasting, because this was ceased in 2000 at the Löffelstelzen transmission site.

== See also ==
- List of towers
