= German Diabetes Center Mergentheim =

Diabetes Zentrum Mergentheim
- Diabetes Center Mergentheim (DCM)

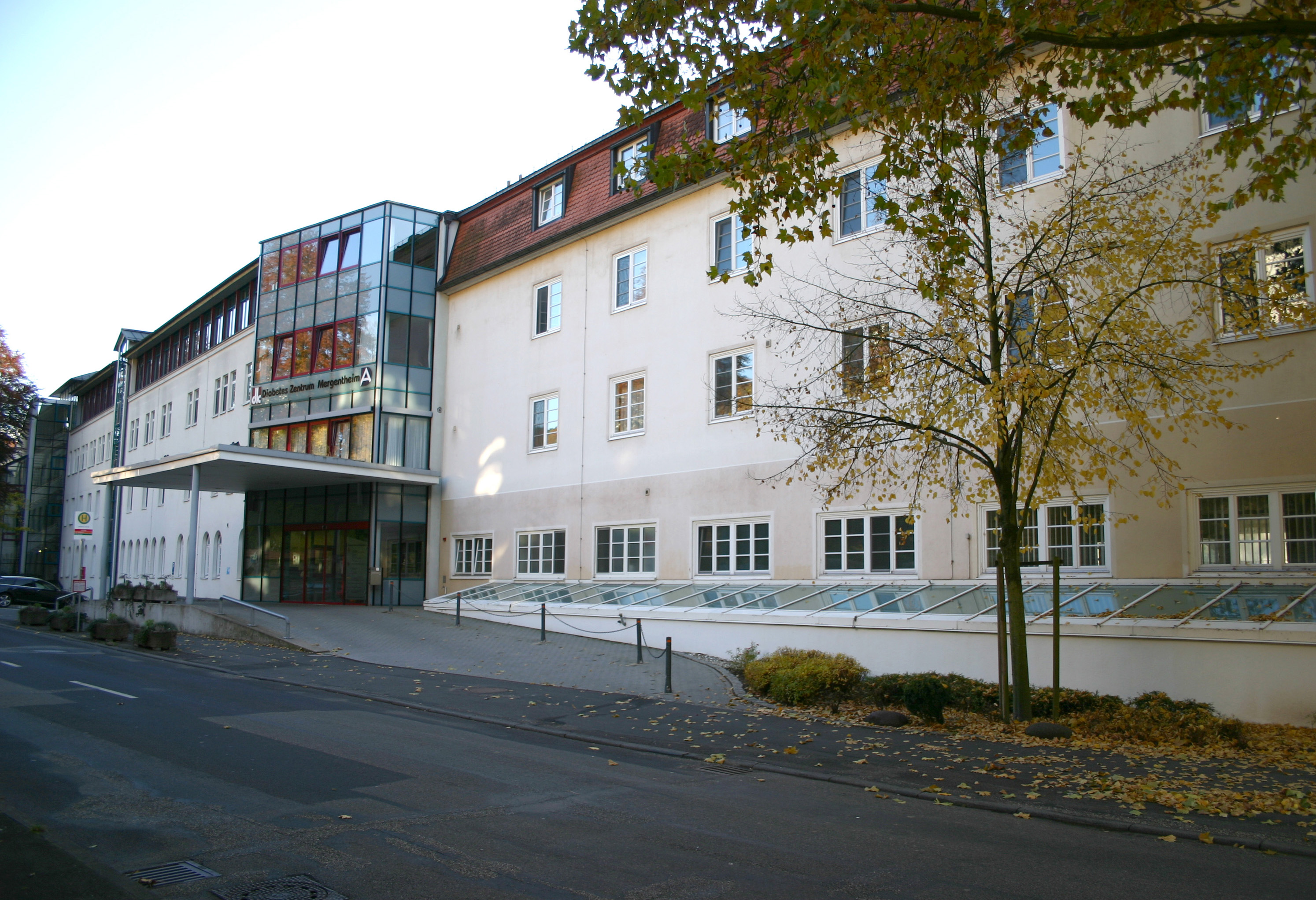
- Main entrance of the Diabetes Center Mergentheim

- Shown within Baden-Württemberg, Germany

Geography
- Location: Bad Mergentheim, Main-Tauber, Baden-Württemberg, Germany
- Coordinates: 49°17′43″N 9°27′52″E

Organisation
- Care system: German Law-enforced health insurance Private
- Type: Specialist

Services
- Emergency department: available
- Beds: 155 (2011)
- Speciality: Diabetes mellitus

History
- Founded: 1983

Links
- Website: http://www.diabetes-zentrum.de
- Lists: Hospitals in Germany

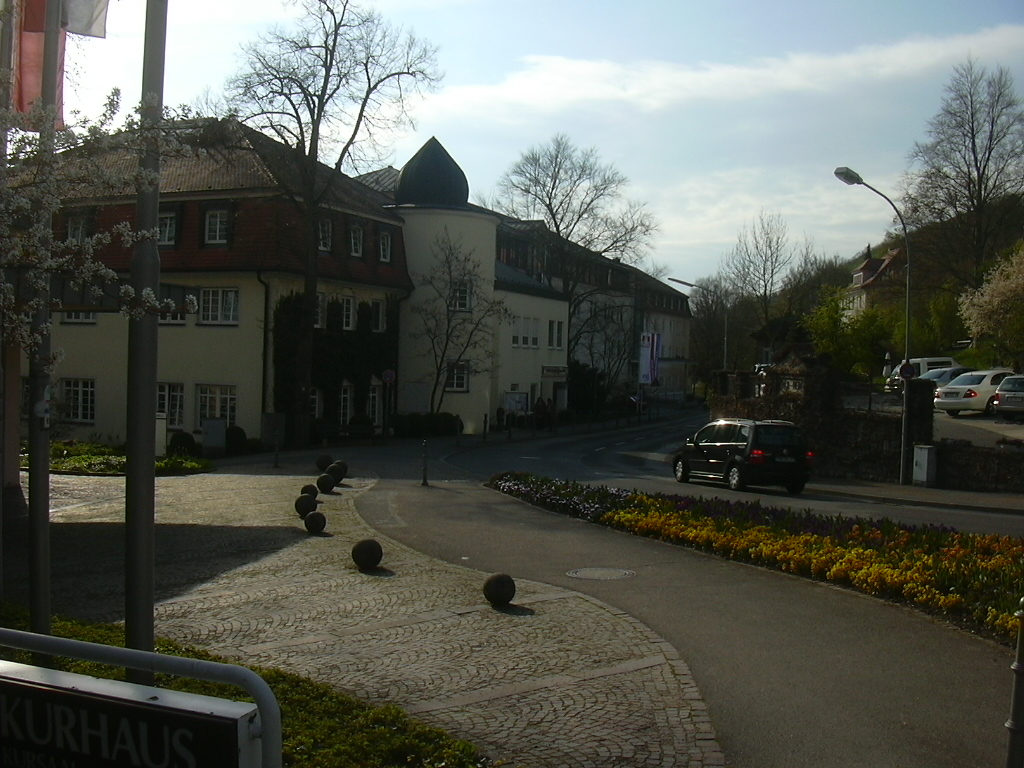
Side view of the German Diabetes Center Mergentheim

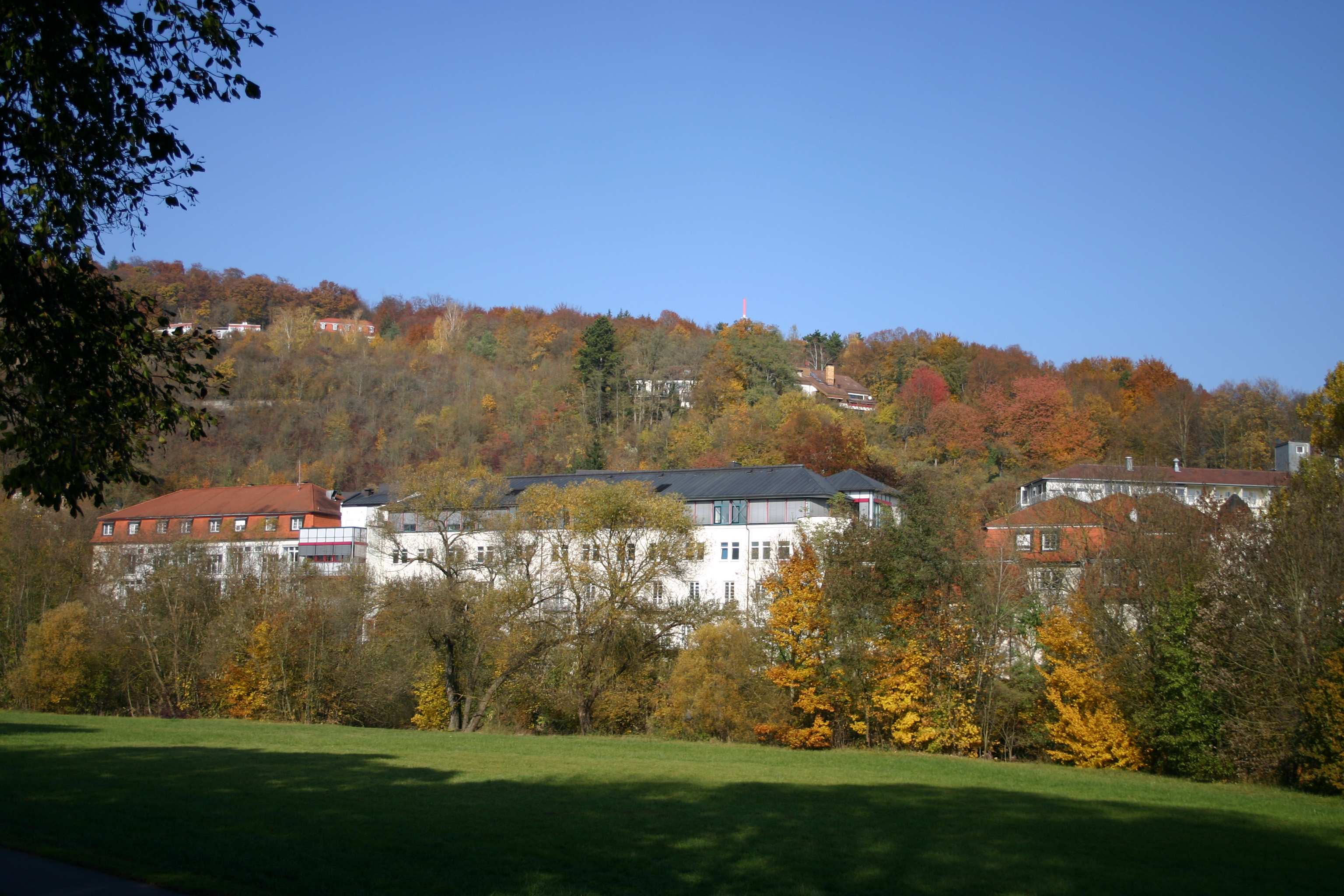
View from the river Tauber to the back of the German Diabetes Center Mergentheim

The Diabetes Center Mergentheim (DCM) is a large and modern treatment center for people with diabetes mellitus in Germany. The center includes the Diabetes-Clinic, the Diabetes-Academy, FIDAM, the Diabetes-Medical Practice, ConDiaZ and InsulinJA.

== History ==
On January 1, 1983, the Diabetes Clinic Bad Mergentheim was established as a private organised institution.

== Structure ==
=== Diabetes-Clinic ===
As an emergency hospital the Diabetes-Clinic fulfils the assignment of the state Baden-Wuerttemberg in the treatment of people with diabetes mellitus as in-patients. All 155 clinic beds are included in the countrywide organised hospital programme. Annually about 3,700 http://www.bwkg.de/datenbanken/krankenhaus-reha-und-pflegeheimfuehrer/detailsansicht-krankenhausfuehrer.html people with diabetes mellitus are treated in the specialised hospital, especially when the out-patient therapy trials for these people have been exhausted. This includes the treatment of patients with complicated diabetes foot ulcers, complex accompanying diseases and secondary complications.

Another medical focus is the treatment of disorders in motivation and acceptance as well as the treatment of diabetes mellitus associated with depression and other psychosomatic disorders. The therapeutic options are supplemented with the insulin pump therapy.

Annually about 400 children and adolescents with diabetes mellitus are treated as in-patients. With respect to these disease management programmes, the Diabetes-Clinic is the third level of patient-centred health care. The first level refers to primary health care by the family doctor and the second level is covered by specialised medical care.

=== Diabetes-Academy ===
The Diabetes-Academy is a non-profit foundation for diabetes mellitus in matters of science, education (for medical professionals and other professional groups) as well as valuable patient information. Every year about 3,500 people receive further education at the Diabetes-Academy Bad Mergentheim e. V.

The Diabetes-Academy was founded on March 15, 1983, and in the meantime the total number of members grew up to 1,700. Annually about 40 educational events are held at the academy. Further events are conducted nationwide by teachers of the academy. All educational events are certified and qualified for recognition by the Medical Association of Germany with training points.

In co-operation with the German Diabetes-Association (DDG) the Diabetes Academy Bad Mergentheim is a recognised training centre for diabetes advisors with respect to the guidelines of the DDG and a competence training centre for chiropodists DDG. In co-operation with the Diabetes-Clinic it is possible for medical professionals to continue studying in the fields of diabetes mellitus to become a qualified diabetologist according to the guidelines of the DDG. As well it is possible for psychologists to acquire the additional certification “Qualified Psychologist DDG”.

=== FIDAM GmbH ===
The FIDAM GmbH – Research Institute of the Diabetes Academy Mergentheim was established in November 2006. The main purposes of their business activities are: The conduct of clinical trials, research and consultancy in the field of diabetes treatment. And the main focuses of the institution are the development and verification of modern training and medical treatment programmes for people with diabetes mellitus, the training of trainers, the evaluation of new technologies and the gathering of patient-reported outcomes.

=== InsulinJA ===
InsulinJA is a non-profit organisation for young people with diabetes mellitus. The purpose of the association is the direct support of young people with diabetes mellitus and other chronic diseases as well as to support their relatives and further affected people. Donations help to support measures purposeful which enable a more optimised diabetes care for children and adolescents.

== Certifications ==
1. QMKD certificate since April 10, 2008
  The quality management of the Diabetes Center Mergentheim was admitted to the quality guidelines according to the nationwide Association of the Clinical Diabetes Federation Facilities (BVKD e. V.).
2. The Diabetes Center Mergentheim is recognised for type 1 and type 2 diabetics (stage 1 and 2) and as an in-patient treatment centre for complicated diabetic foot ulcers according to the guidelines of the German Diabetes Association (DDG).
