= Rheinsender =

SWR transmission station near Wolfsheim

Coordinates: 49°52′42″N 8°03′04″E

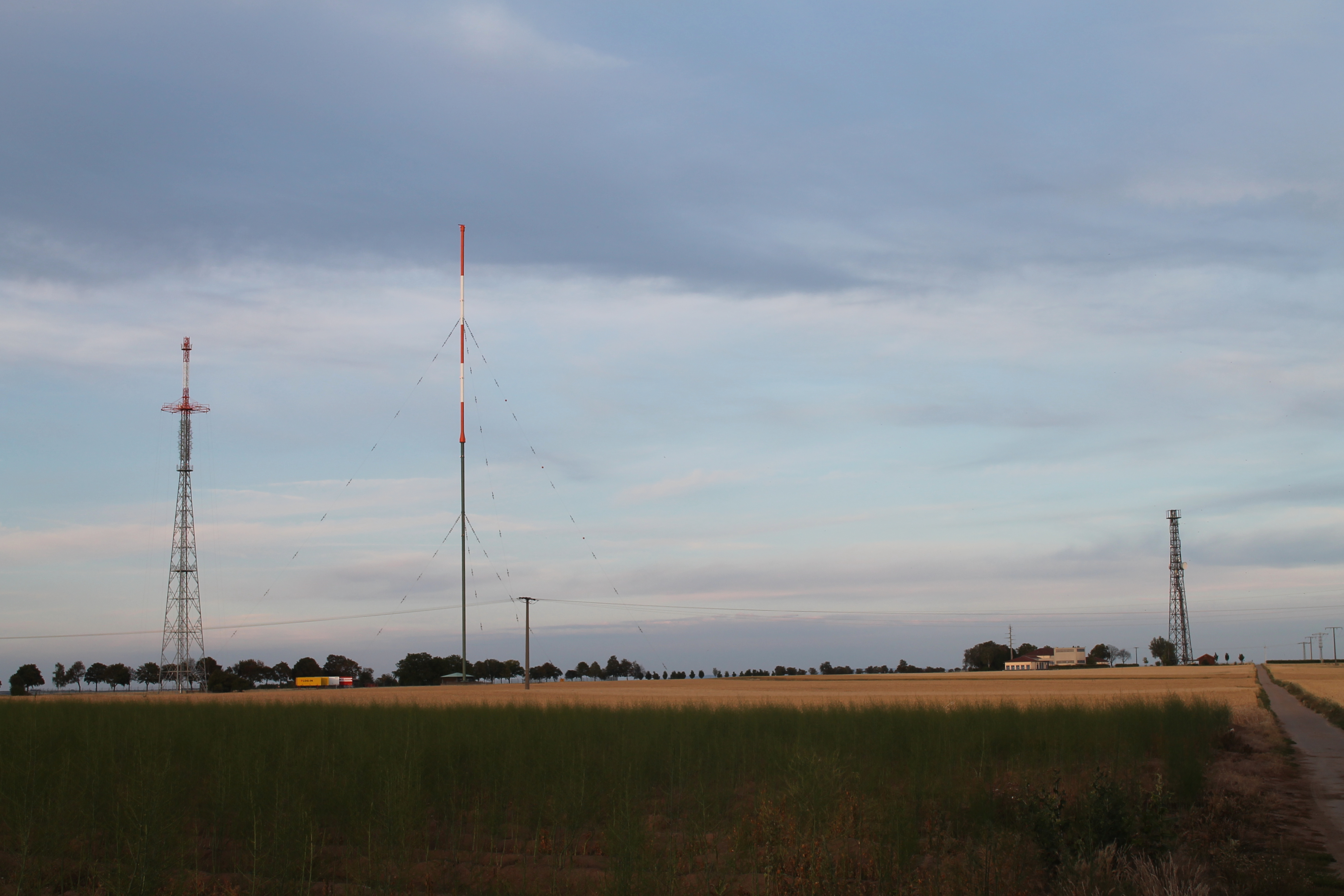
Rheinsender in 2011. The taler tower got demolished in 2012

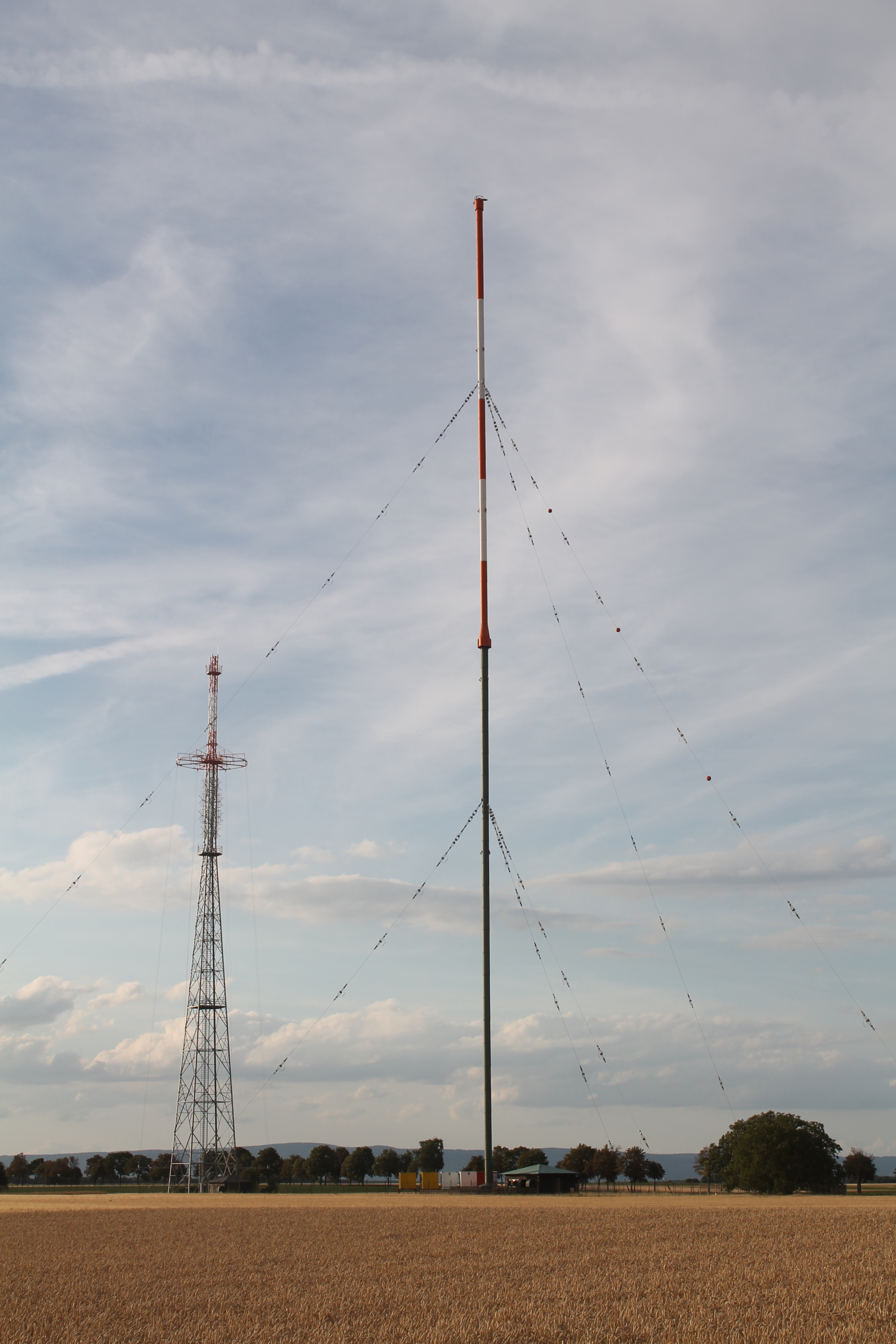
the two towers of Rheinsender - 150 m mast radiator and lattice tower with cage antenna in 2011

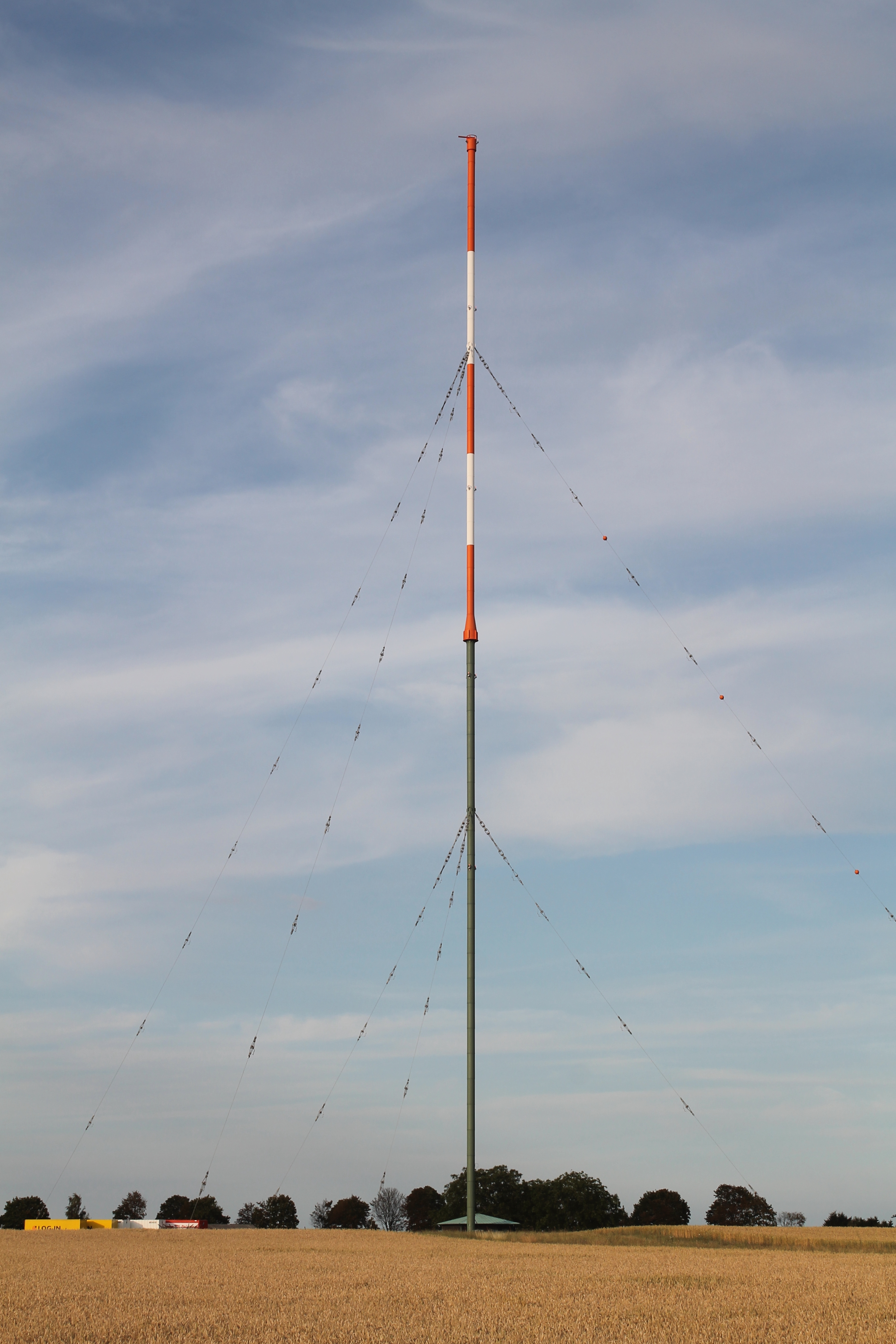
150 m tall mast radiator of Rheinsender in 2011

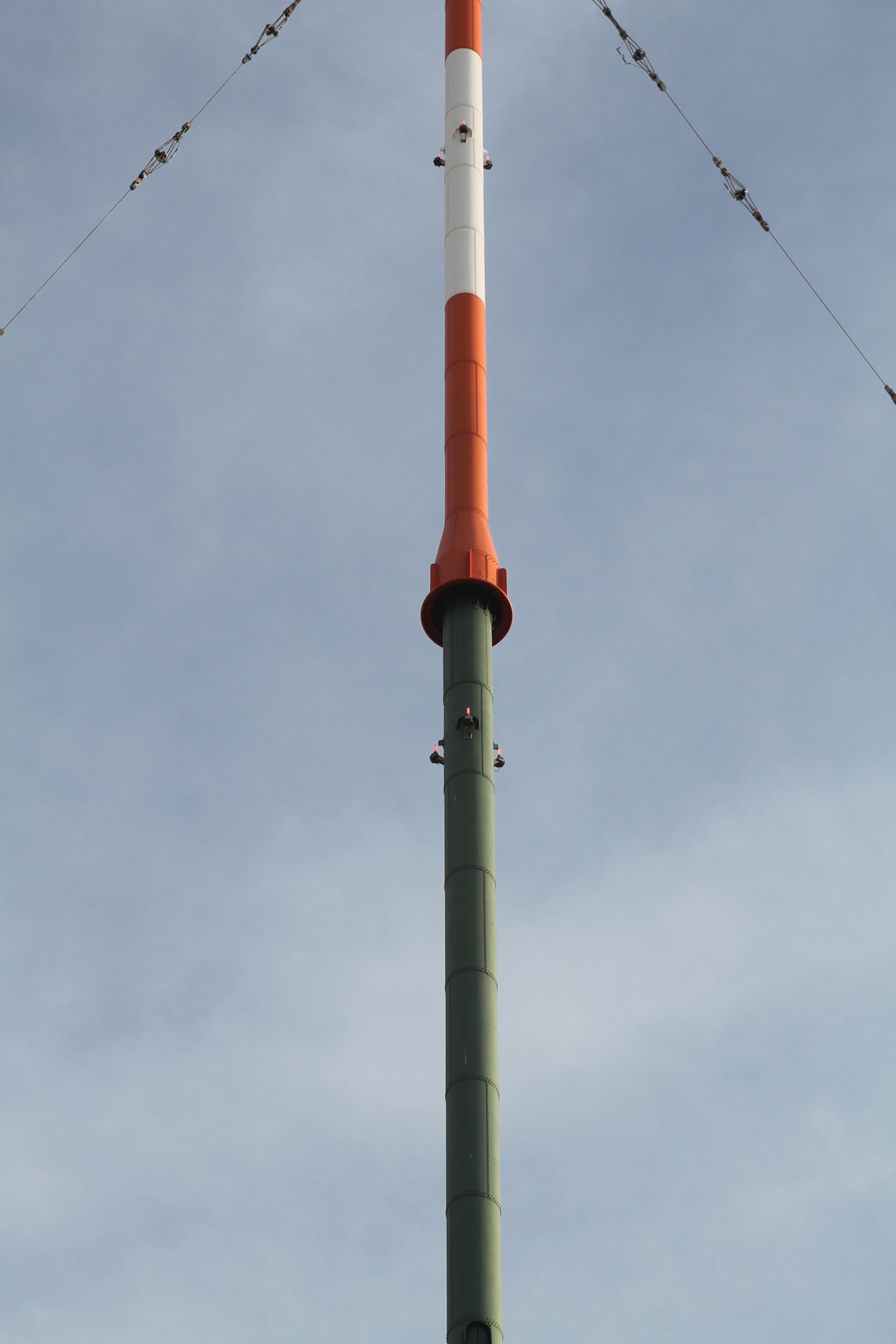
Intermediate insualator of 150 m tall mast radiator

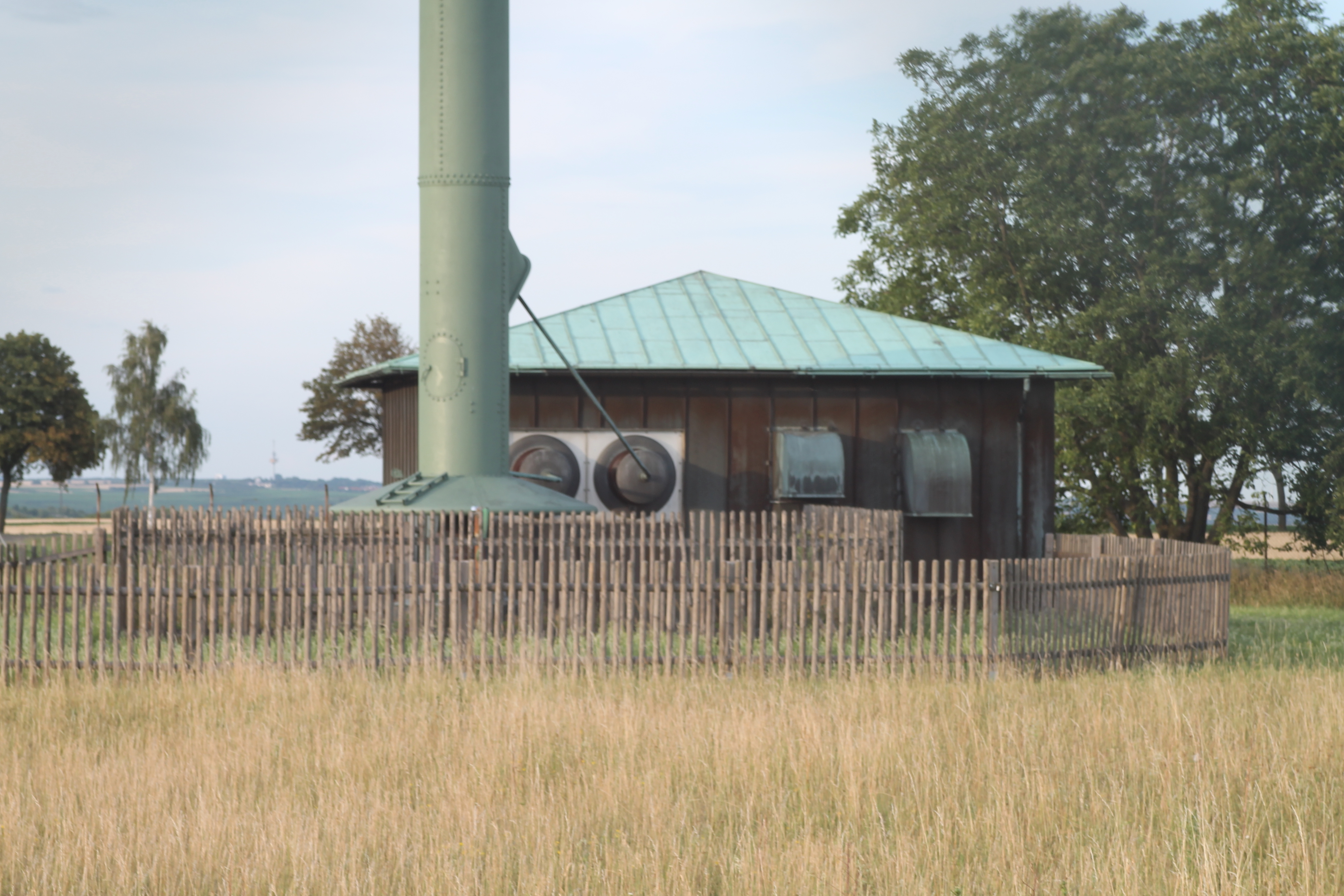
Base of 150 m tall mast radiator of Rheinsender

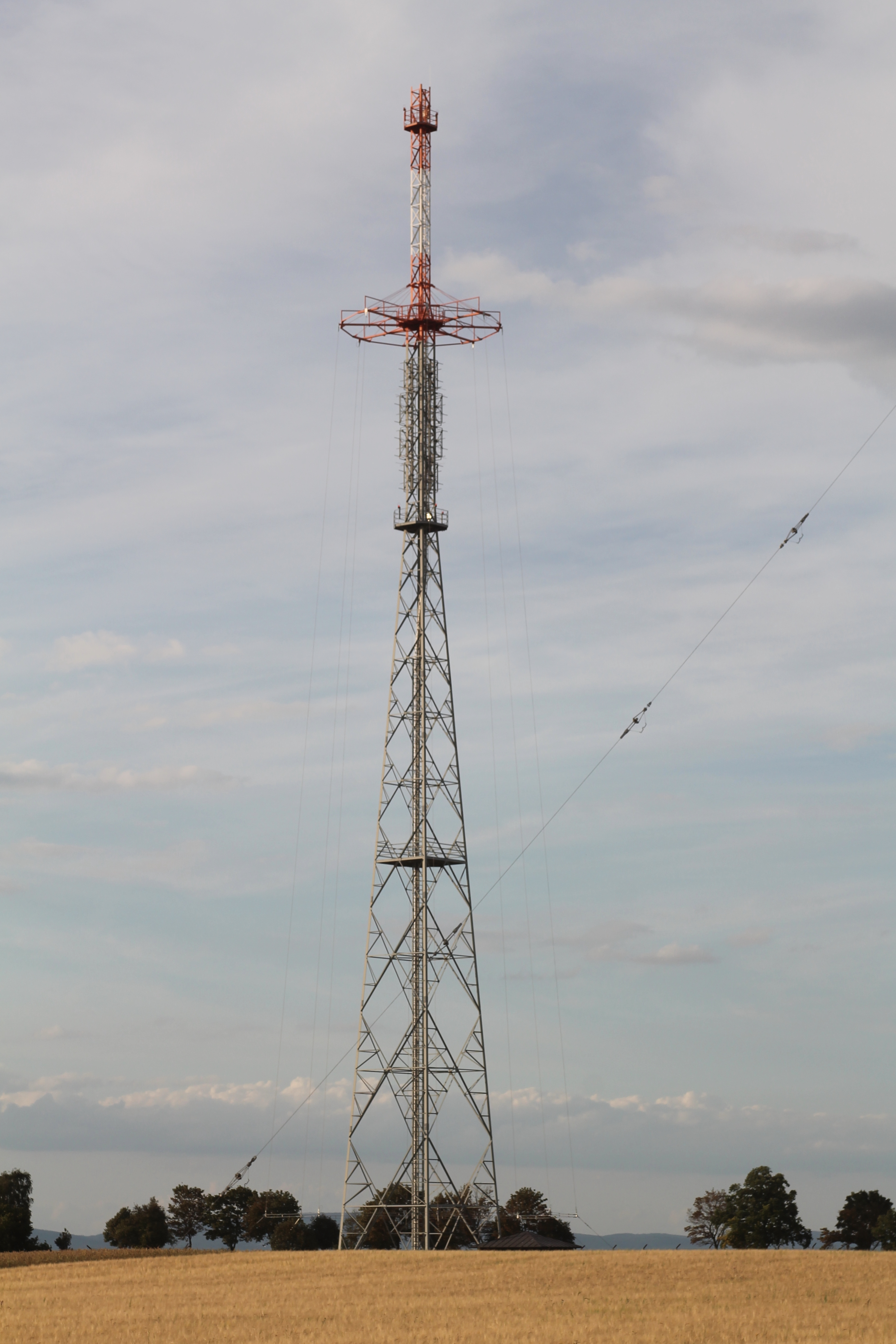
70 m tall lattice tower of Rheinsender

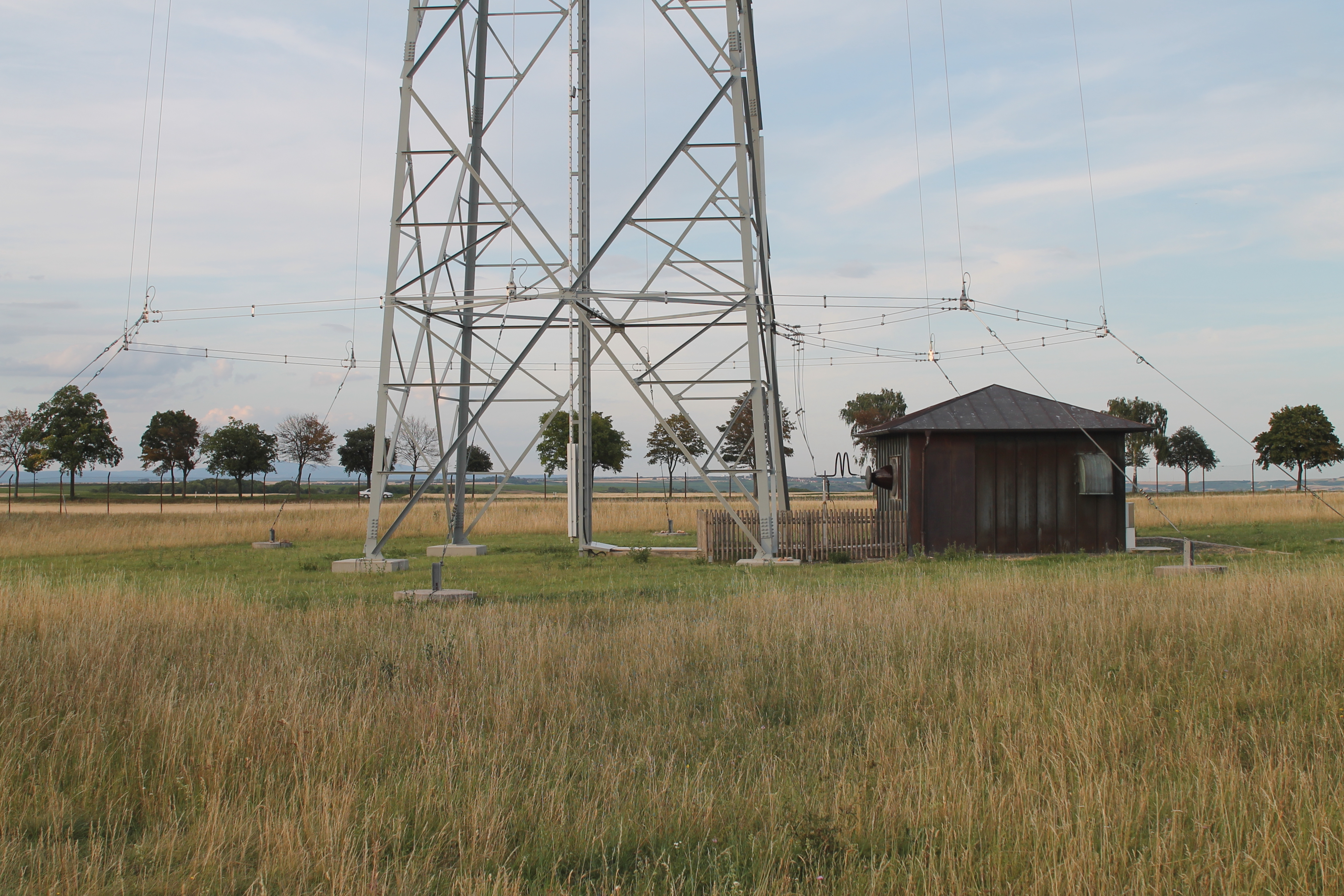
Basement of 70 m tower of Rheinsender

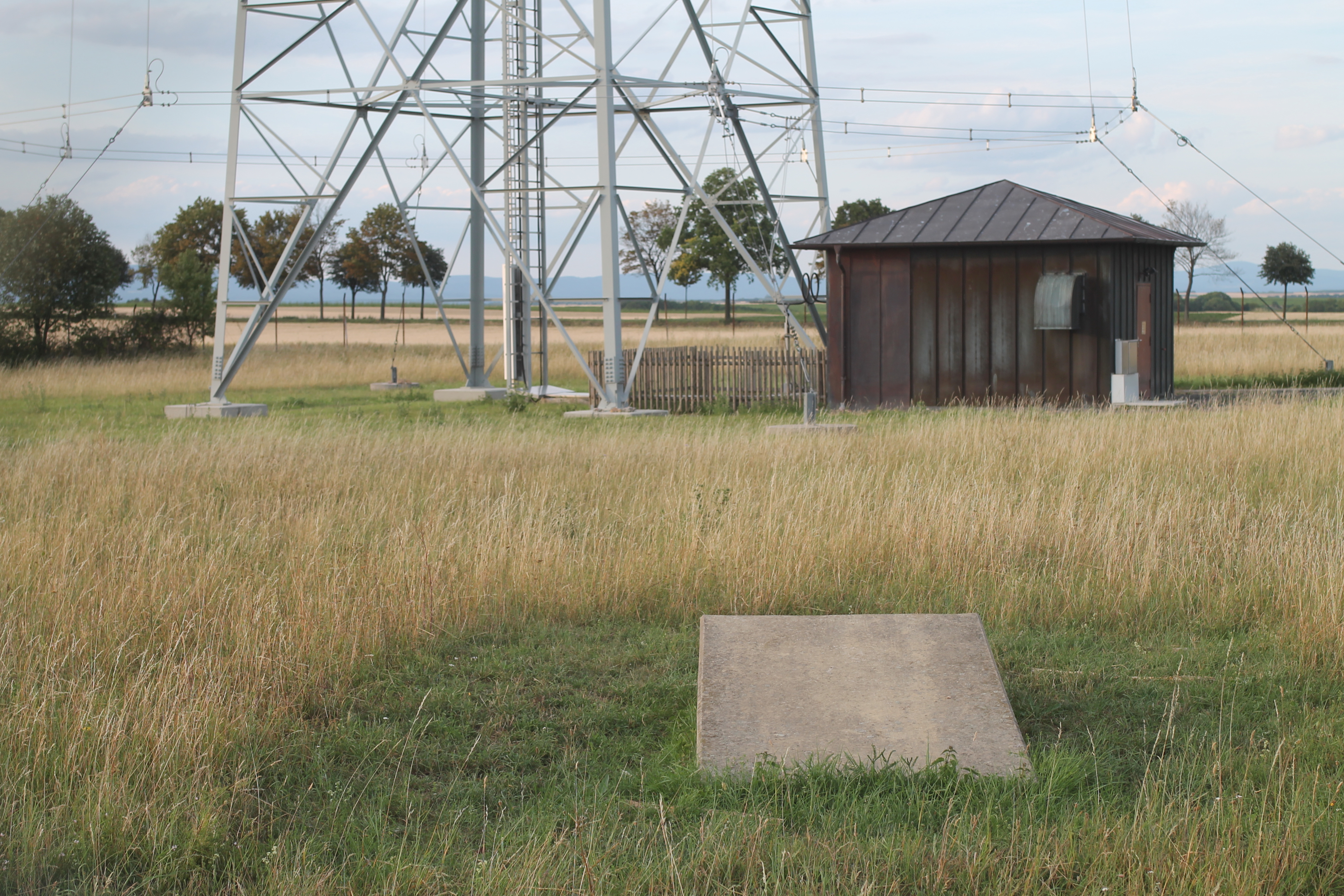
Basement of 70 m tower of Rheinsender with former anchor block of demolished mast in foreground

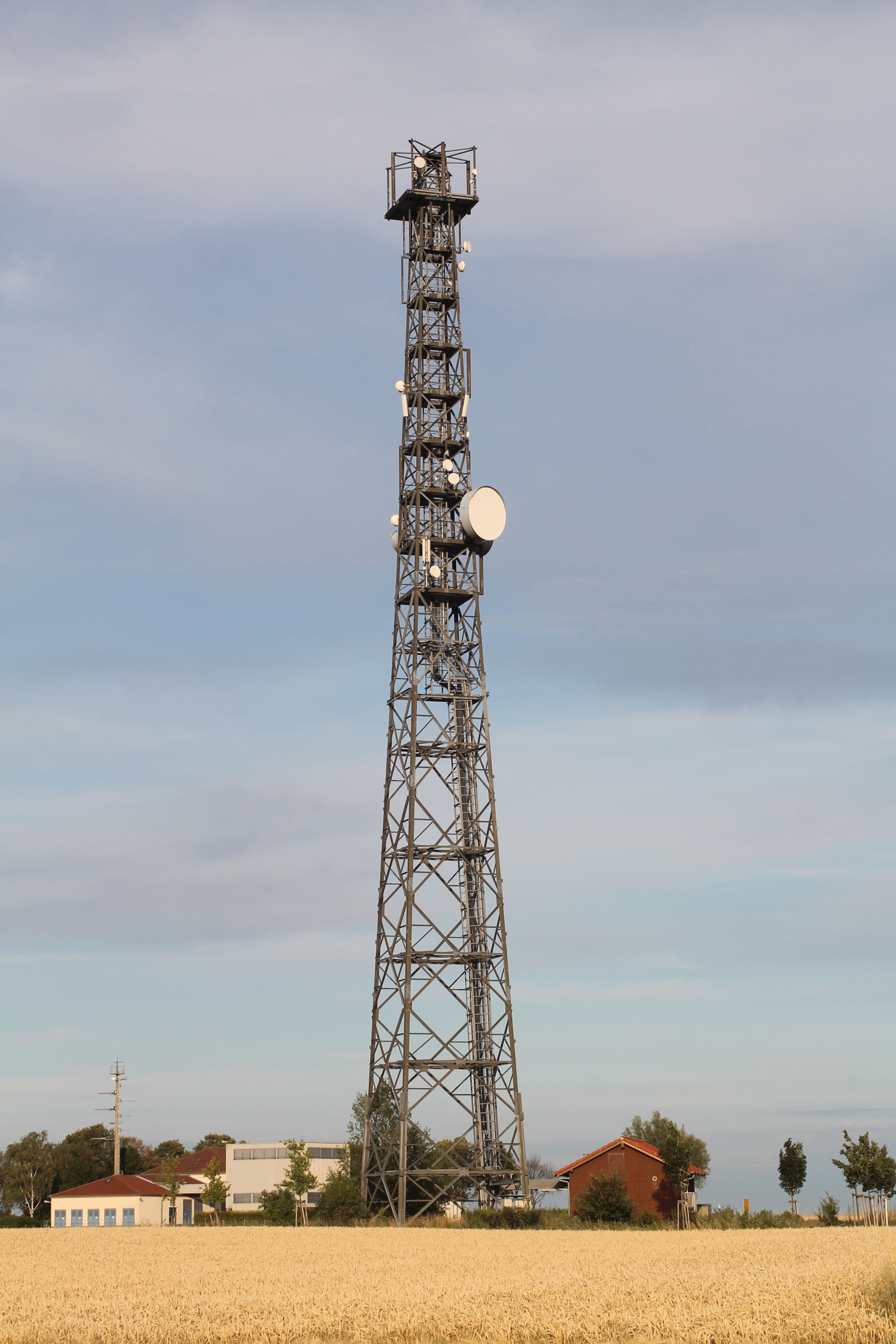
Mobile phone transmission tower near Rheinsender

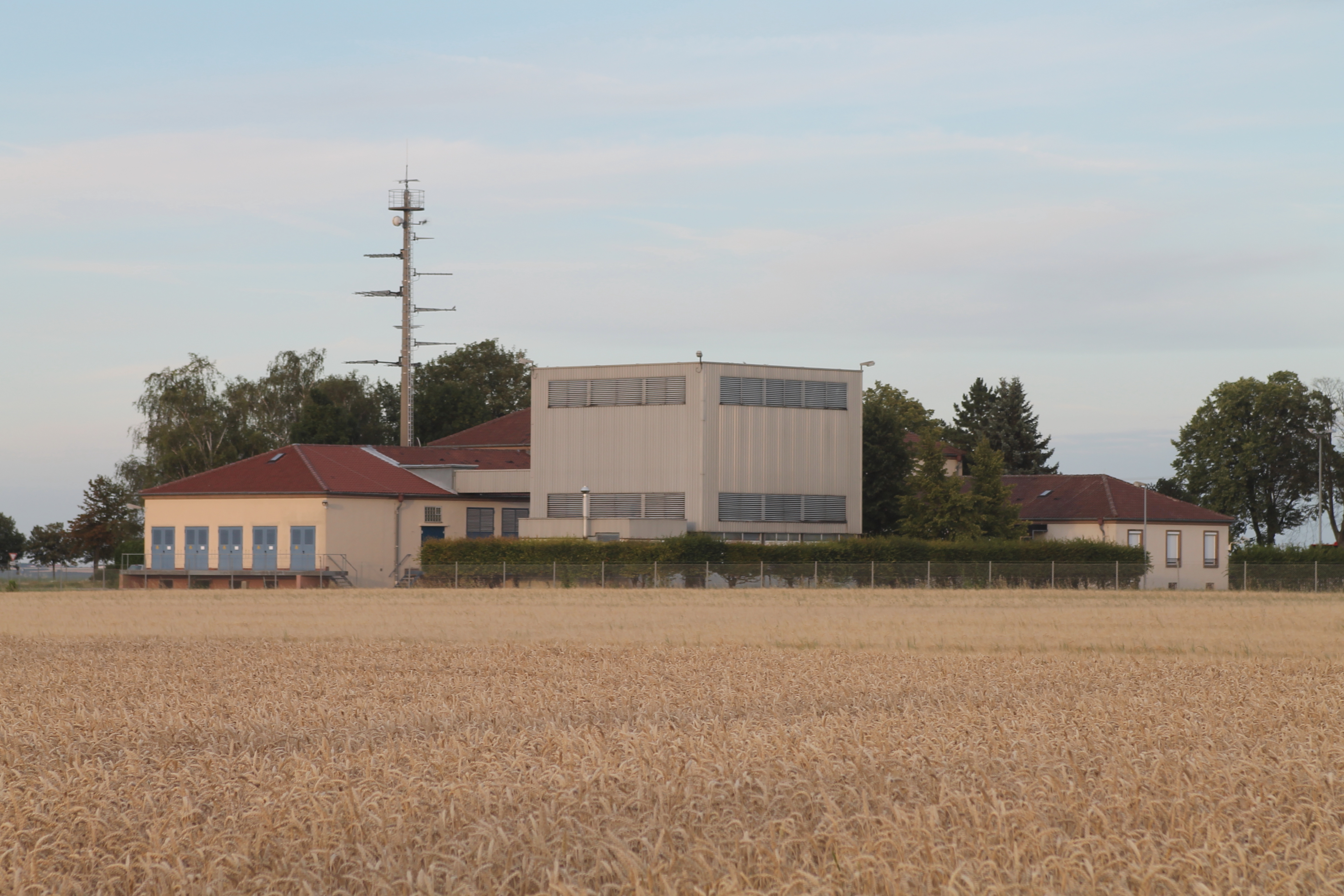
Transmitter building of Rheinsender

The Rheinsender ("Rhine transmitter") is an FM radio transmission site for the German Südwestrundfunk regional public broadcasting system. The Rheinsender is located near Wolfsheim, southwest of Mainz.

Historically the Rhinesender was a large medium-wave transmission facility near. The transmitter was established in 1950 and went on the air May 15, 1950. It belonged to SWR (until 1998 to SWF) and transmitted until the middle of the 1990s with 600 kilowatts, later reduced to 100 kilowatts. In 2012 the medium-wave mast got demolished.

Today SWR is using the smaller mast for FM transmission.

== History ==
From 1950 to 2003 two 150-metre-high guyed steel tube masts were used as the transmission aerial, which are insulated from ground and which were separated by an insulator in the mast construction electrically in two parts for double feeding as fade reducing aerial. By the usage of two masts a direction minimum toward the southeast was obtained according to international regulations when working with a transmission power of 600 kilowatts at nighttime.

Furthermore, there is a 114-metre-tall guyed steel tube mast, which is also insulated against ground. This mast, which is used as reserve antenna for medium wave broadcasting, has an FM-transmission antenna on its top. Furthermore, there is also a free-standing grounded lattice tower used for radio services in UHF/VHF-ranges.

After transmission power was reduced to 100 kilowatts a direction minimum toward the southeast was no longer necessary and running the transmitter with omnidirectional radiation was possible. Hence the second radio mast was obsolete and was demolished on February 26, 2003. On the remaining radio mast of the Rhine transmitter there are also aerials for FM broadcasting for SWR4 on 94.9 MHz with an output power of 5 kW.

At the site of the demolished radio mast, a further grounded free-standing lattice tower was built in 2003. On this tower in 2004 a cage antenna was installed, which was used for broadcasting the SWR programmes Dasding and SWR cont.ra, in the DRM-mode on 1485 kHz with an output power on 0.42 kW from 2005 to 2008.

== See also ==
- List of masts
