= Wolfsheim, Germany =

Wolfsheim
- Municipality
- Coat of arms

- Location of Wolfsheim within Mainz-Bingen district
- Interactive map of Wolfsheim
- Location within Germany Location within Rhineland-Palatinate
- Coordinates: 49°52′29″N 8°02′29″E
- Country: Germany
- State: Rhineland-Palatinate
- District: Mainz-Bingen
- Municipal assoc.: Sprendlingen-Gensingen

Government
  - Mayor (2023–24): Mechthild Walldorf

Area
  - Total: 4.99 km^{2} (1.93 sq mi)
- Elevation: 215 m (705 ft)

Population (2025-12-31)
  - Total: 811
  - Density: 163/km^{2} (421/sq mi)
- Time zone: UTC+01:00 (CET)
  - Summer (DST): UTC+02:00 (CEST)
- Postal codes: 55578
- Dialling codes: 06701
- Vehicle registration: MZ
- Website: www.wolfsheim-rheinhessen.de

Wolfsheim (German pronunciation: [ˈvɔlfshaɪm]) is an Ortsgemeinde – a municipality belonging to a Verbandsgemeinde, a kind of collective municipality – in the Mainz-Bingen district in Rhineland-Palatinate, Germany.

== Geography ==
The municipality lies in Rhenish Hesse.

== History ==
The placename likely goes back to a Frankish settler named Wulfilo. In the geographer Gerardus Mercator’s 1595 world atlas, the place was catalogued under the name WOLFZIM

In 1844, within Wolfsheim’s limits, an important gold find was made at a princely grave from the time of the Migration Period (Völkerwanderung). The find comes from the early 5th century and today can be found in the Wiesbaden Museum in the collection of Nassau antiquities.

A Late Roman “knob glass” – crafted with glass knobs on it – shaped like a kantharos, was found while some drainage pits were being dug in the Im Weiler rural area. That can be found in the Landesmuseum Mainz.

On 15 May 1950, the Rheinsender (“Rhine Transmitter”) near Wolfsheim was brought into service by Südwestfunk SWF (now Südwestrundfunk SWR).

In 1974, Wolfsheim was split away from the Alzey-Worms district and incorporated into the Mainz-Bingen district.

== Rheinsender Wolfsheim ==
The municipality's landmark is the Rheinsender, a large medium-wave transmission facility that can be seen from a great distance, broadcasting on the frequency 1 017 kHz.

Until the mid-1990s, the transmitter's output power was 600 kW. Over the last few years that has been reduced to 100 kW.

The sending antenna originally consisted of two identical 150-metre tall mast radiators insulated against ground, which were electrically split into two parts by a dividing insulator. They ensured that the signal faded out towards the southeast as called for by international agreements with a 600-kilowatt operation. After the radiant power was reduced to 100 kilowatts, this fading was obsolete and the second mast superfluous. On 26 February 2003, it was blown up.
