= Ludolf König von Wattzau =

20th Grandmaster of the Teutonic Order

- Hochmeister
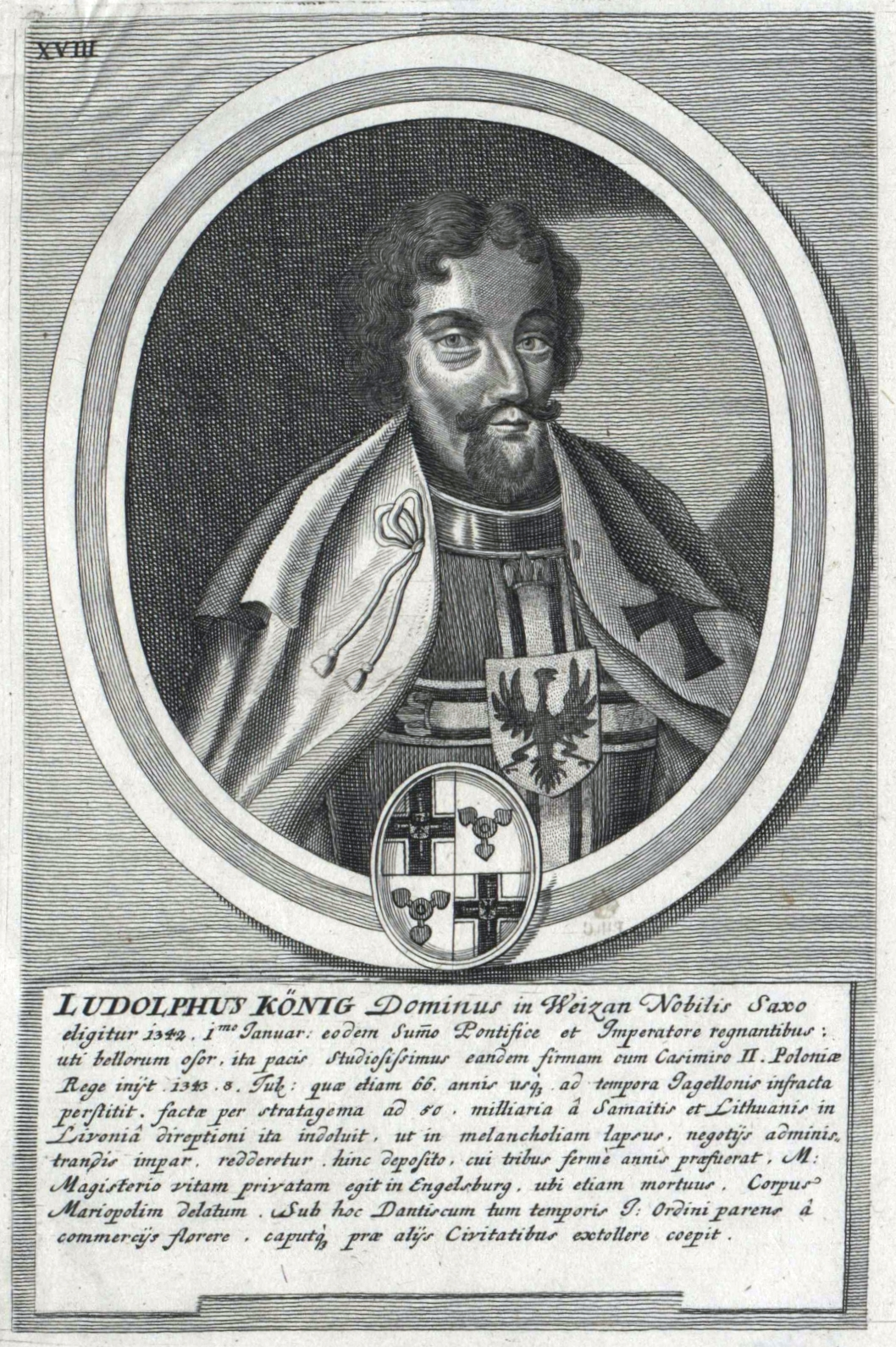
- 1684 depiction of Ludolf

Grand Master of the Teutonic Knights
- Reign: January 1342 – 1345
- Predecessor: Dietrich von Altenburg
- Successor: Heinrich Dusemer
- Born: 1280–1290
- Died: 1348 or later Pokrzywno, Grudziądz County, Poland
- Burial: Under the Chapel of St. Anne in the Malbork Castle, Marienburg

Ludolf König von Wattzau (between 1280 and 1290 – 1348 or later), sometimes referred to as simply Ludolf König in English translations, was the 20th Grandmaster of the Teutonic Order, ruling the order's state in the Baltics from 1342 to 1345.

== Biography ==
He came from a Saxon noble family.

From 1331 to 1338, he was the chief treasurer of the Teutonic Order, after which, he became Grand Commander of the Teutonic Order, and "komtur" or commander of the Teutonic capital of Marienburg in 1338. Under his tenure, the city of Marienburg and its surroundings underwent large-scale development and colonization. In January 1342, the Teutonic Order's chapter elected him Grandmaster in the wake of Dietrich von Altenburg's death in October 1341.

Ludolf's reign's as grandmaster of the Teutonic Order was highlighted by the 1343 Treaty of Kalisz between the order, and the Kingdom of Poland, under King Casimir III the Great. The treaty formally concluded the Polish–Teutonic War of 1326–1332 and resulted in territorial exchanges between the two parties. Though there were still disputes (most notably over Pomerelia), the treaty ultimately led to 66 years of peace between Poland and the Teutonic Knights, ending with the Polish–Lithuanian–Teutonic War of 1409–1411.

Following in the steps of his predecessors, he pursued a campaign against the Lithuanians as part of the greater Lithuanian Crusades fought against the still-pagan Lithuanian peoples. The expedition was a disaster for the order, with much of Prussia being razed by the Lithuanians in retaliation. According to some sources, the stress spurred from the war's failure sent Ludolf into mental illness. He resigned as grandmaster, being downgraded to being commander of Engelsburg, or Pokrzywno. He was succeeded by Heinrich Dusemer. He spent the rest of his life at Engelsburg, apparently recovered from his mental illness, and died as early as 1348. He was buried under the chapel of St. Anne in the Malbork Castle.

He, along with three other Teutonic grandmasters, were found in crypts unveiled by archaeologists in 2007 within the chapel of St. Anne.

Grand Master of the Teutonic Order
Preceded by Dietrich von Altenburg	Hochmeister; 1341- 1345	Succeeded by Heinrich Dusemer
