= Heinrich Dusemer =

21st Grandmaster of the Teutonic Order

- Hochmeister
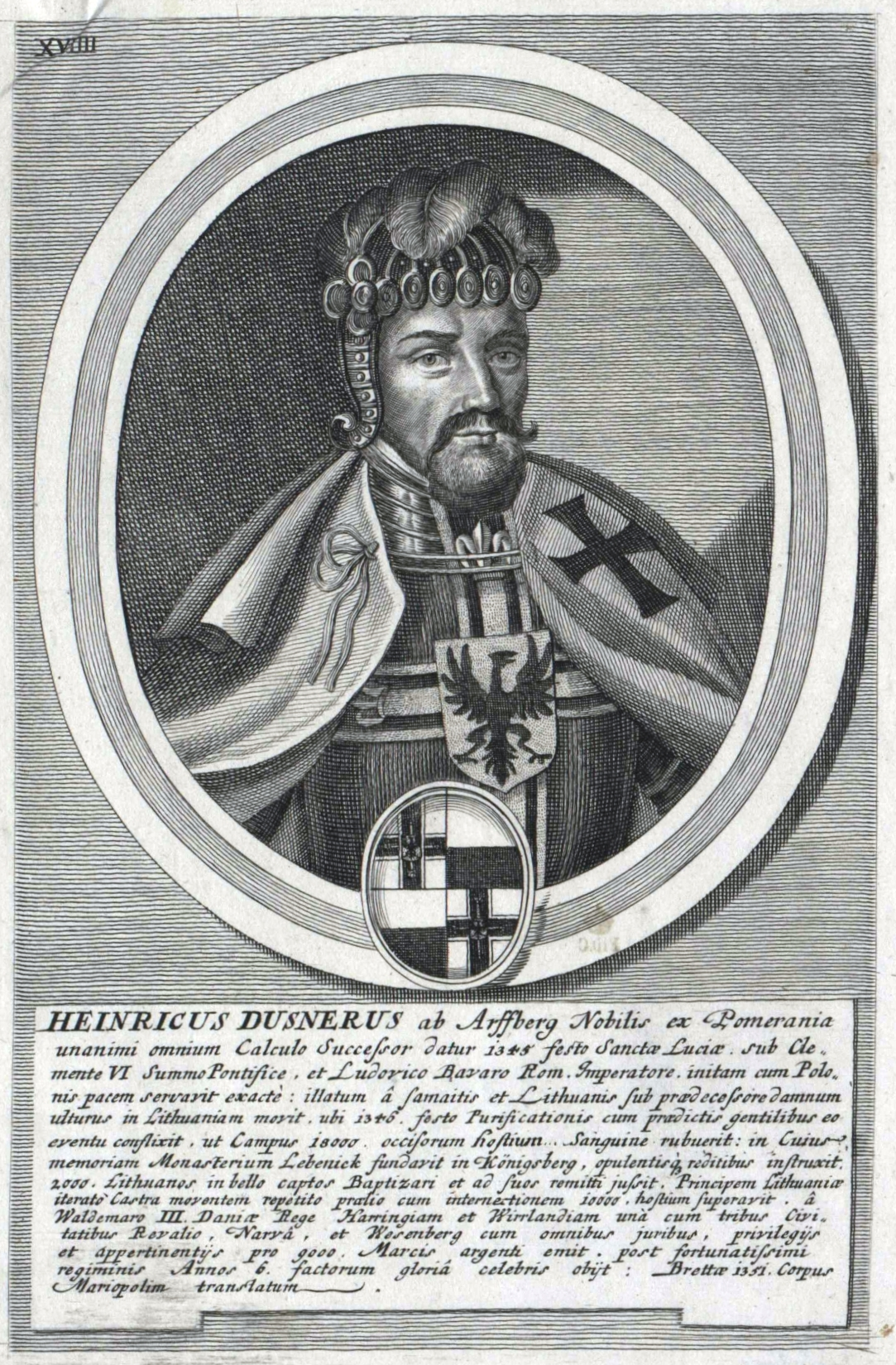
- 1684 depiction of Heinrich

Grand Master of the Teutonic Knights
- Reign: December 13, 1345 - 1351
- Predecessor: Ludolf König von Wattzau
- Successor: Winrich von Kniprode
- Born: c. 1280; Likely in either Franconia or Bavaria
- Died: 1353; Bratian
- Burial: Under the Chapel of St. Anne in the Malbork Castle, Marienburg
Names
- Heinrich Dusemer von Arf(f)berg

Heinrich Dusemer von Arfberg (c. 1280–1353), or simply Heinrich Dusemer, was the 21st grandmaster of the Teutonic Order.

== Biography ==
He is first mentioned as a member of the Teutonic Order in 1311. As a youthful knight, he often engaged in combat with the Lithuanians, and according to monastic legend, defeated the Grand Duke of Lithuania, Vytenis, in a duel. Vytenis later honored him for his courage and chivalry in battle. In 1318, he is mentioned as a member of the convent of Polessk castle. He became commander of Ragnit in 1329 and became mayor of Sambia in 1334. He became commander of Brandenburg in the same year, and then Grand Marshall and commander of Koningsberg. From 1335 to 1339, he was commander-in-chief of the order's army.

In 1339, a dispute between him and then grandmaster Dietrich von Altenburg resulted in Dusemer's demotion and exile to Brodnica, where he became commander. In either 1343 or 1344, he fought against the Estonians.

=== Rule ===
In September 1345, Grandmaster Ludolf Konig, who according to historical records, was mentally reeling from a failed campaign against the Lithuanians, resigned, and on December 13, 1345, Dusemer was elected Grandmaster of the Teutonic Order. Shortly following his election, in 1346, Estonia was acquired by the Teutons from the Danes for 19,000 marks. War with the Lithuanians resumed under his reign, ending in the decisive Battle of Strėva on February 2, 1348, which rendered the Lithuanians as a non-threat for decades. The Teutons intended to subdue the entirety of Lithuania, however, the Black Death reached Prussia in that year, resulting in Dusemer being forced to widthraw his troops from the area.

In 1349 he approved one of the rare monastery foundations of the time of the order for the Benedictine nuns in Löbenicht . He expressed his gratitude for the victory over the Lithuanians at Strėva. The monastery was endowed with substantial property in the form of forests in the district of Wehlau. The forests later bore the name Löbenichtscher Hospitalforst.

Under his reign, construction started on the grandmaster's palace in the Teutonic capital of Marienburg. Talks with the Kingdom of Poland resulted in the establishment of a definitive Teutonic-Polish border in 1349 in Pomerania.

In 1351, probably due to illness, Henry Dusemer resigned from office. He left for Bratian and no longer held any honorable functions. He died in Bratian in 1353. He was buried in Malbork in the mausoleum of the grand masters of the Teutonic Order under the chapel of St. Anna.

Grand Master of the Teutonic Order
Preceded by Ludolf König von Wattzau	Hochmeister; 1345–1351	Succeeded by Winrich von Kniprode
