= Malbork Castle =

Teutonic castle in Poland

- Zamek w Malborku (Polish)
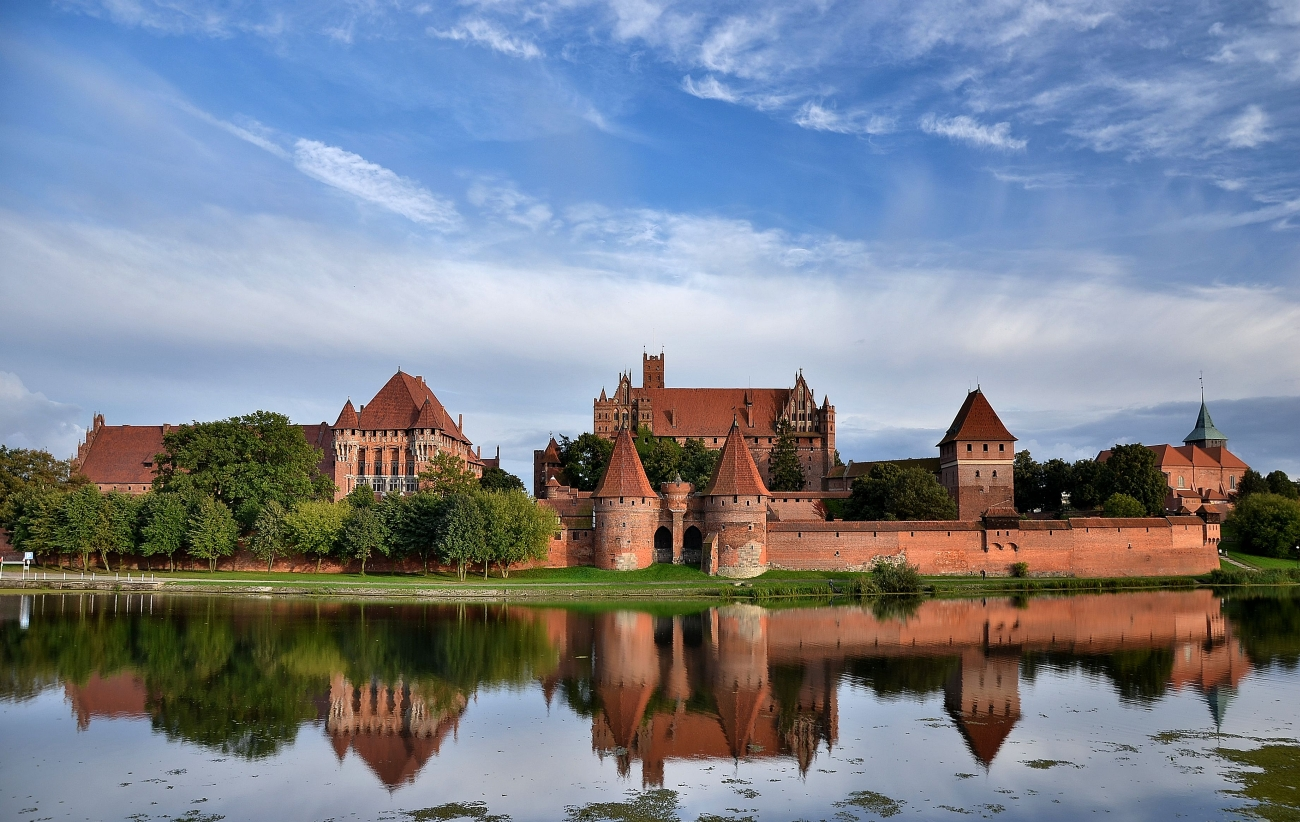
- Malbork Castle from across the Nogat

- Location within Poland Location within Pomeranian Voivodeship
- 54°02′23″N 19°01′40″E
- Location: Malbork, Poland

History
- Built: 13th century

UNESCO World Heritage Site
- Official name: Castle of the Teutonic Order in Malbork
- Type: Cultural
- Criteria: ii, iii, iv
- Designated: 1997 (21st session)
- Reference no.: 847
- Region: Poland

Historic Monument of Poland
- Designated: 1994-09-08
- Reference no.: M.P. z 1994 r. Nr 50, poz. 420

The Castle of the Teutonic Order in Malbork, commonly known as Malbork Castle (Polish: Zamek w Malborku; German: Ordensburg Marienburg), is a Brick Gothic castle complex located in the town of Malbork, Poland, built in the 13th and significantly expanded in the 14th century. It is the largest castle in the world measured by land area and a UNESCO World Heritage Site.

It was constructed by the Teutonic Order, a German Catholic religious order of crusaders, in the form of an Ordensburg fortress and named Marienburg in honour of Mary, mother of Jesus. In 1457, during the Thirteen Years' War, the castle was sold by Bohemian mercenaries to King Casimir IV of Poland in lieu of indemnities. It then served as one of several Polish royal residences and the seat of Polish offices and institutions, interrupted by several years of Swedish occupation, fulfilling this function until the First Partition of Poland in 1772. From then on, the castle was under German rule for over 170 years until 1945, albeit largely falling into disrepair as military technological advances rendered the castle a mere historical point of interest.

The construction period is a point of debate, but most historians generally accept the 132 years between 1274 and 1406 as the construction time. The castle is a classic example of a medieval fortress and, upon its completion in 1406, was the world's largest brick castle.

UNESCO designated the "Castle of the Teutonic Order in Malbork" and the Malbork Castle Museum a World Heritage Site in December 1997. It is one of two World Heritage Sites in the region of north-central Poland, together with the "Medieval Town of Toruń", which was founded in 1231. Malbork Castle is also one of Poland's official national Historic Monuments (Pomnik historii), as designated on 8 September 1994. Its listing is maintained by the National Heritage Board of Poland.

== History ==
=== Origins ===
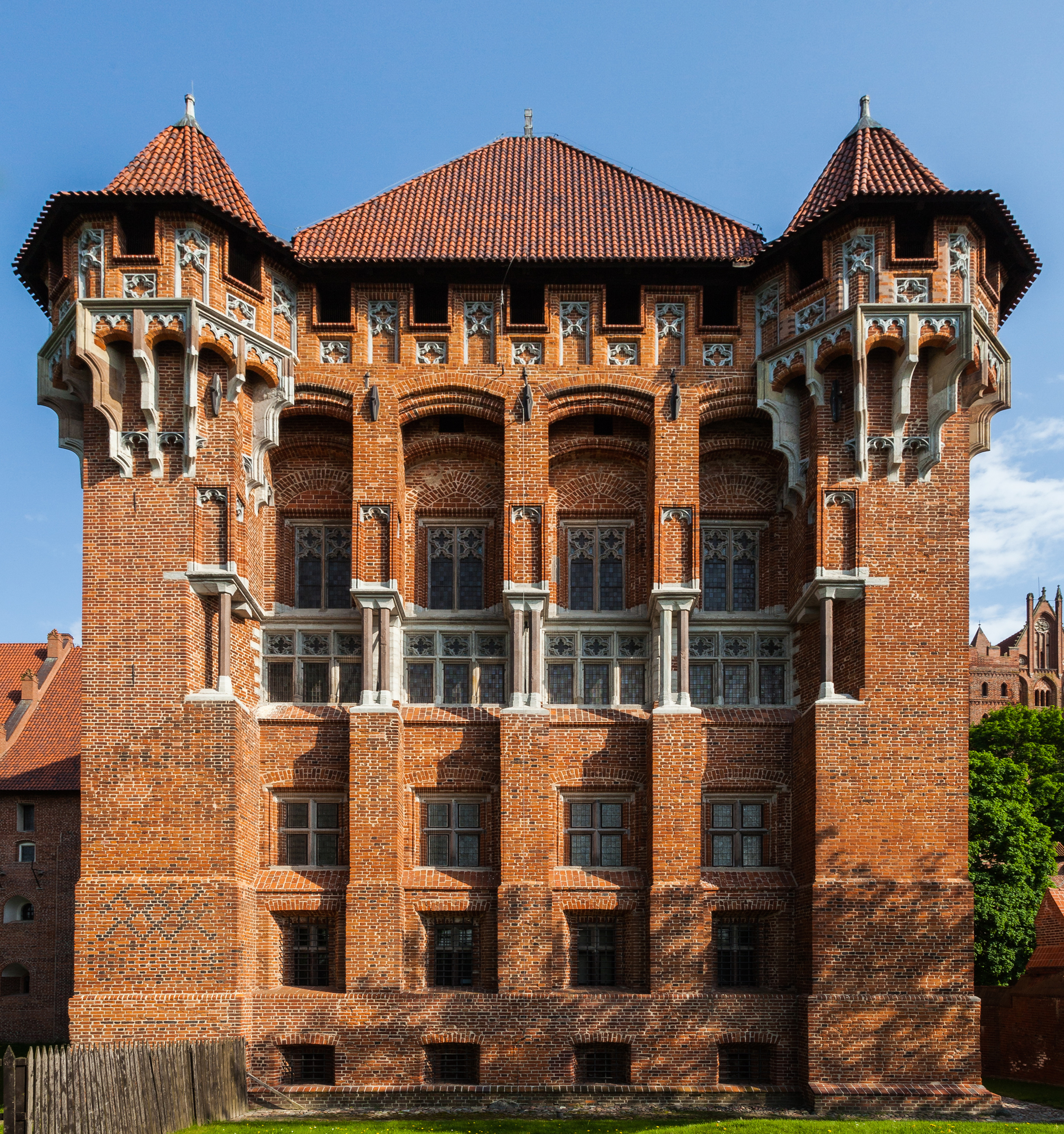
Northwestern facade of Grand Masters' Palace

The Teutonic Order had been created in 1191 in Acre (present-day Israel). When this last major stronghold of the Crusader states in the Levant fell to the Muslims in 1291, the Order moved its headquarters to Venice before arriving in Prussia.

The castle was built by the Order after the conquest of Old Prussia (c. 1222–1274). Its main purpose was to strengthen their own control of the area following the Order's 1274 suppression of the Great Prussian Uprising of the Baltic tribes. No contemporary documents survive relating to its construction, so instead the castle's phases have been worked out through the study of architecture and the Order's administrative records and later histories. The work lasted until around 1300, under the auspices of Commander Heinrich von Wilnowe. The castle is located on the southeastern bank of the river Nogat. It was named Marienburg after Mary, patron saint of the religious Order.

Malbork became more important in the aftermath of the Teutonic Knights' conquest of Gdańsk (Danzig) and Eastern Pomerania in 1308. The Order's administrative centre was moved to Marienburg from Elbing (now Elbląg). The Grand Master of the Teutonic Knights, Siegfried von Feuchtwangen, who arrived in Marienburg from Venice, undertook the next phase of the fortress' construction. In 1309, in the wake of the papal persecution of the Knights Templar and the Teutonic takeover of Danzig, Feuchtwangen relocated his headquarters to the Prussian part of the Order's monastic state. He chose the site of Marienburg conveniently located on the Nogat in the Vistula Delta. As with most cities of the time, the new centre was dependent on water for transportation.

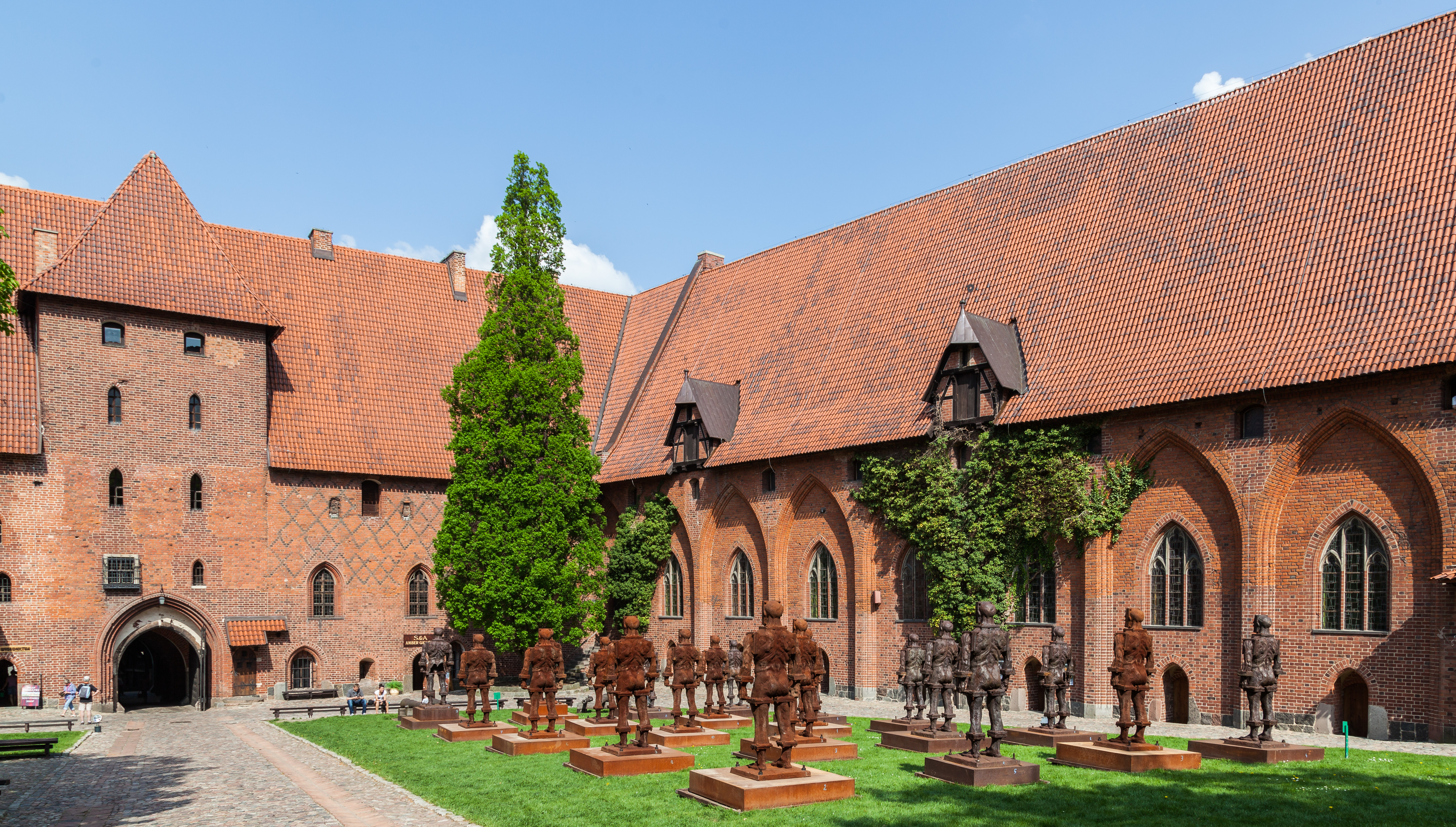
Array of iron warriors in the courtyard

The castle was expanded several times to house the growing number of Knights. Soon, it became the largest fortified Gothic building in Europe, on a nearly 21-hectare (52-acre) site. The castle has several subdivisions and numerous layers of defensive walls. It consists of three separate castles – the High, Middle and Lower Castles, separated by multiple dry moats and towers. The castle once housed approximately 3,000 "brothers in arms". The outermost castle walls enclose 21 ha (52 acres), four times the enclosed area of Windsor Castle. The developed part of the property designated as a World Heritage Site is 18.038 ha (44.57 acres).

The favourable position of the castle on the river Nogat allowed easy access by barges and trading ships arriving from the Vistula and the Baltic Sea. During their governance, the Teutonic Knights collected river tolls from passing ships, as did other castles along the rivers. They controlled a monopoly on the trade of amber. When the city became a member of the Hanseatic League, many Hanseatic meetings were held there.

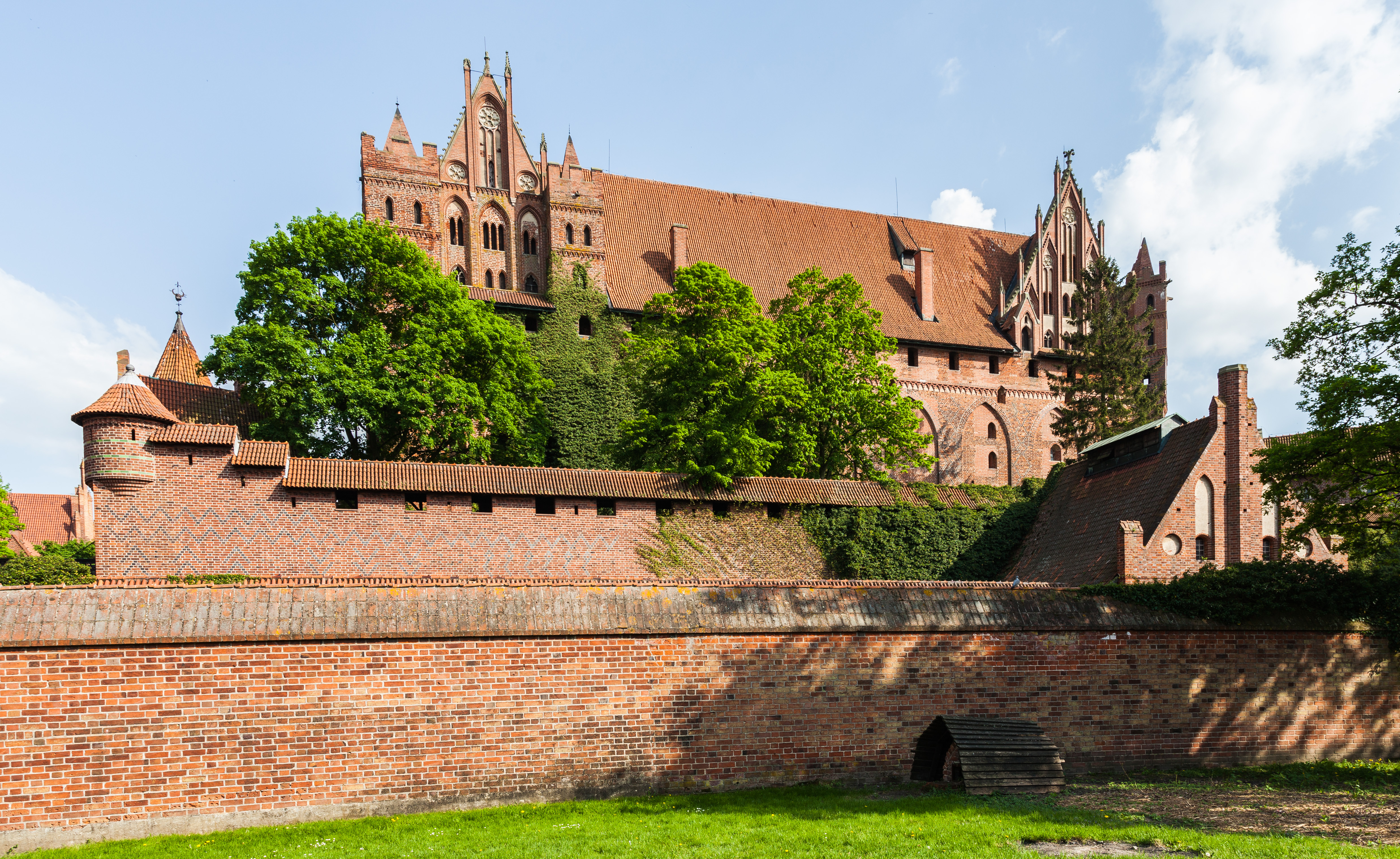
View of the High Castle from the west

In 1361, the future Grand Duke of Lithuania Kęstutis was briefly imprisoned in the castle. In 1365, Polish King Casimir III the Great visited the castle.

In the summer of 1410, the castle was besieged following the Order's defeat by the armies of Władysław II Jagiełło and Vytautas the Great (Witold) at the Battle of Grunwald. Heinrich von Plauen successfully led the defence in the Siege of Marienburg (1410), during which the city outside was razed.

By 1456, during the Thirteen Years' War, the Order faced severe financial distress. Its cities revolted against raised taxes meant to cover ransoms and other war expenses. Long unpaid, the Order's Bohemian mercenaries agreed to sell Malbork and withdraw, compensated with funds raised by Polish General Stibor de Poniec of Ostoja in Danzig. In 1457, King Casimir IV Jagiellon granted Danzig several privileges in gratitude for its wartime and financial support and entered Malbork Castle in triumph.

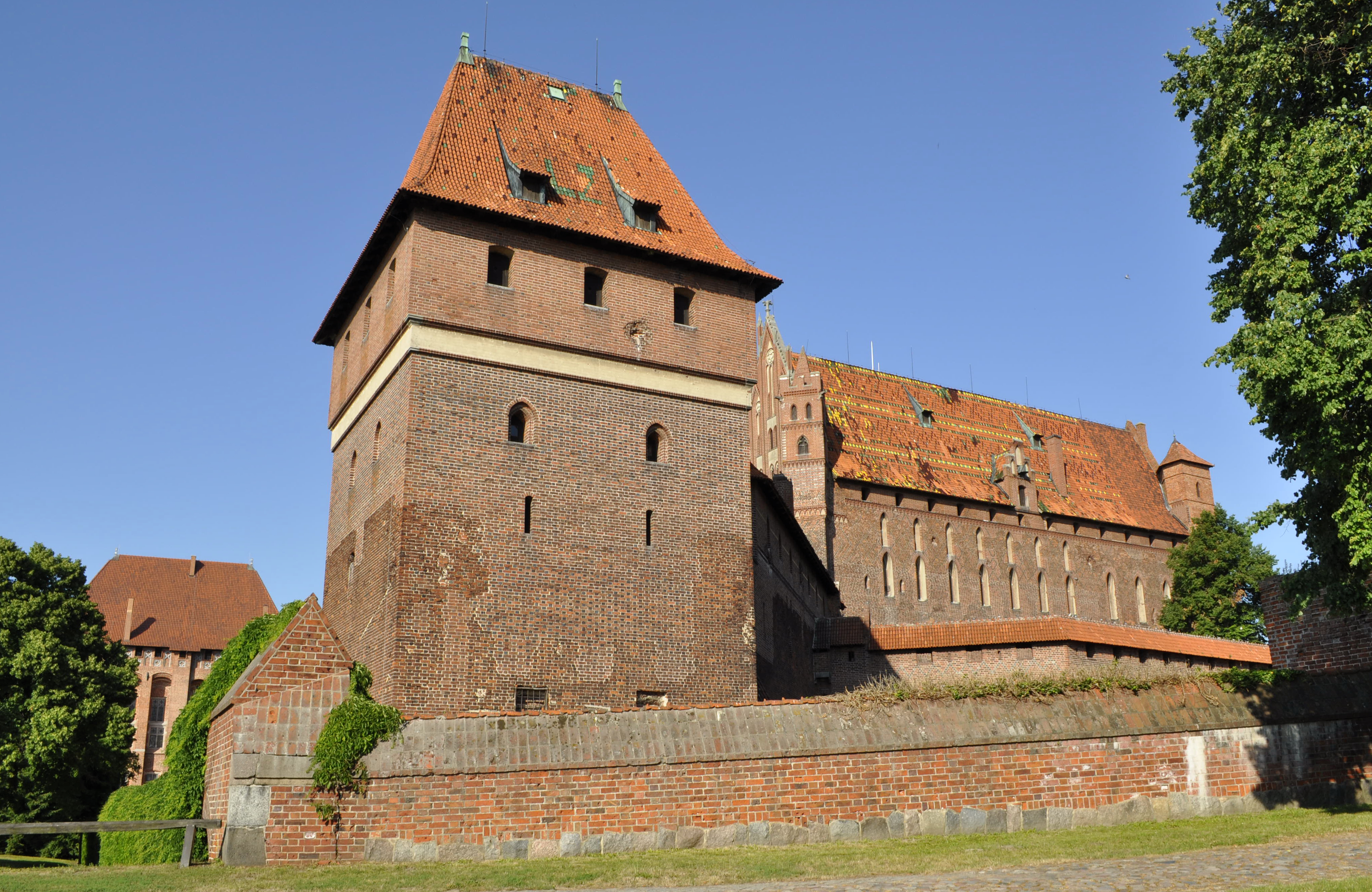
Toilet tower (dansker)

The mayor of the town around the castle, Bartholomäus Blume, resisted the Polish forces for three more years, but the Poles captured and sentenced him to death in 1460. A monument to Blume was erected in 1864.

=== Residence of the Polish kings ===
In 1466 both castle and town became part of the Polish Malbork Voivodeship in the province of Royal Prussia. Since 1457 it served as one of the several Polish royal residences, fulfilling this function for over 300 years until the First Partition of Poland in 1772. During this period the Tall Castle served as the castle's supply storehouse, while the Great Refectory was a place for balls, feasts, and other royal events. Polish Kings often stayed in the castle, especially when travelling to the nearby city of Gdańsk/Danzig. Local Polish officials resided in the castle. From 1568 the castle housed the Polish Admiralty (Komisja Morska) and in 1584 one of the Polish Royal Mints was established here. Also, the largest arsenal of the Polish–Lithuanian Commonwealth was located in the castle. By the decision of King John II Casimir Vasa of 1652, Jesuits took care of the castle chapels of Mary and St. Anne. King Augustus II the Strong allowed the Jesuits to be buried in the castle. The Jesuits held Polish and German church services in the castle. In 1708, Polish King Stanisław Leszczyński, his wife Queen consort Catherine Opalińska, and his mother Anna Leszczyńska resided in the castle for several months.

Map and plans of Malbork castle made in 1629 during the Swedish occupation.

During the Thirty Years' War, in 1626 and 1629 Swedish forces occupied the castle. They invaded and occupied it again from 1656 to 1660 during the Deluge. Then the castle was visited by Swedish kings Gustav Adolf (in 1626) and Charles X Gustav (in 1656).

=== After the Partitions of Poland ===
After Prussia and the Russian Empire made the First Partition of Poland in 1772, the town was annexed by the Kingdom of Prussia and in 1773 it became part of the newly established province of West Prussia. At that time, the king's officers used the rather neglected castle as a barracks for the Prussian Army and also as a poorhouse. The last Jesuits left the castle in 1780. In 1794 David Gilly, a Prussian architect and head of the Royal Office of Works, made a structural survey of the castle, to recommend on its future use or demolition. Gilly's son, Friedrich Gilly, produced several engravings of the castle and its architecture, which he exhibited in Berlin. These were published by Friedrich Frick between 1799 and 1803 and led the Prussian public to "rediscover" the castle and the history of the Teutonic Knights.

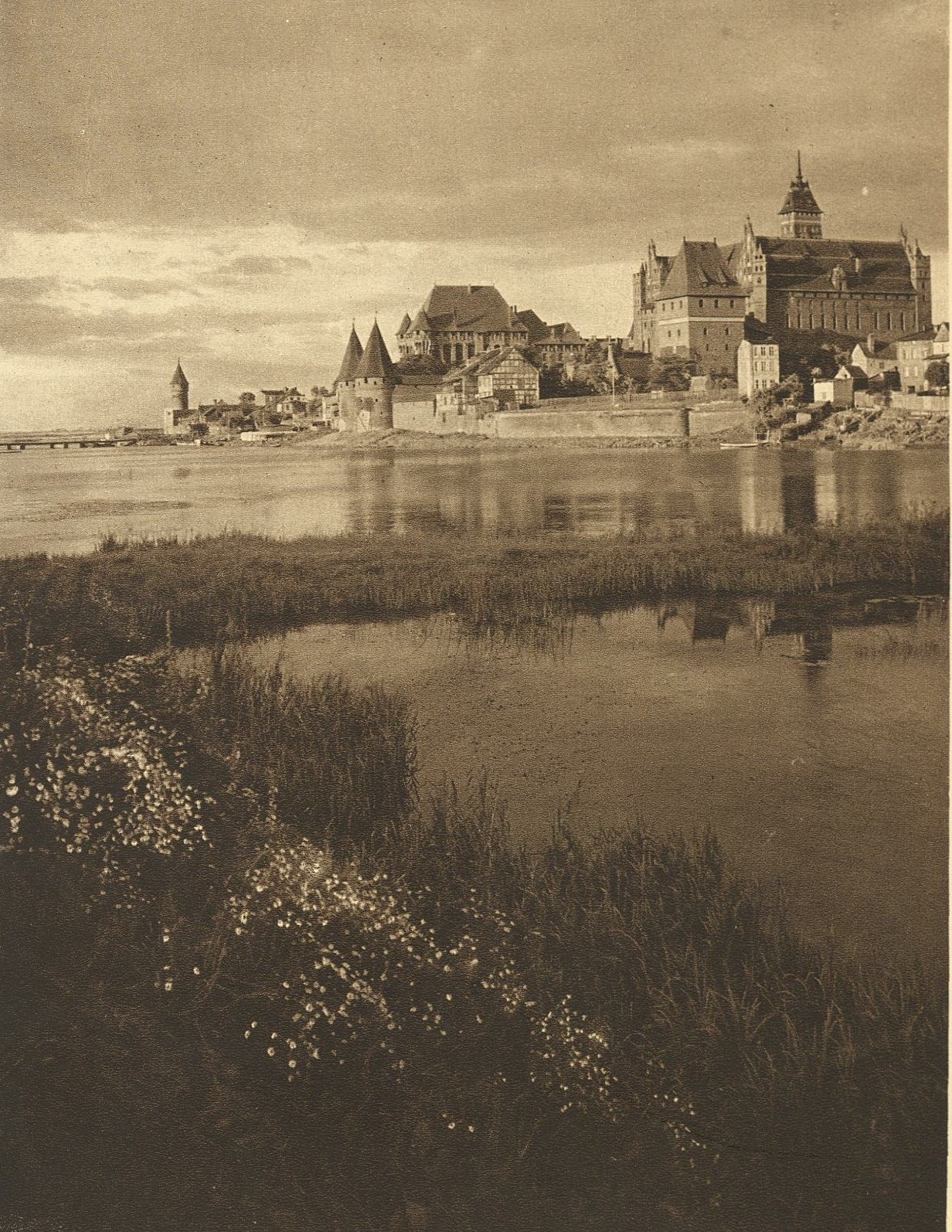
Marienburg photographed in 1924 by Kurt Hielscher

Johann Dominicus Fiorillo published another edition of the engravings on 12 February 1803, also wanting to encourage public interest. Max von Schenkendorf was critical of the defacing of the castle. Throughout the Napoleonic Wars, the Prussian army used the castle as a hospital and arsenal. Napoleon visited the castle in 1807 and 1812. After the War of the Sixth Coalition, the castle became a symbol of Prussian history and national consciousness. In 1816, Theodor von Schön, governor of West Prussia, began the restoration of the castle. In 1910, the Naval Academy Mürwik in Flensburg was built, and the Marienburg was used as a model for this new Red Castle. The restoration of the Marienburg was undertaken in stages until the beginning of the Second World War.

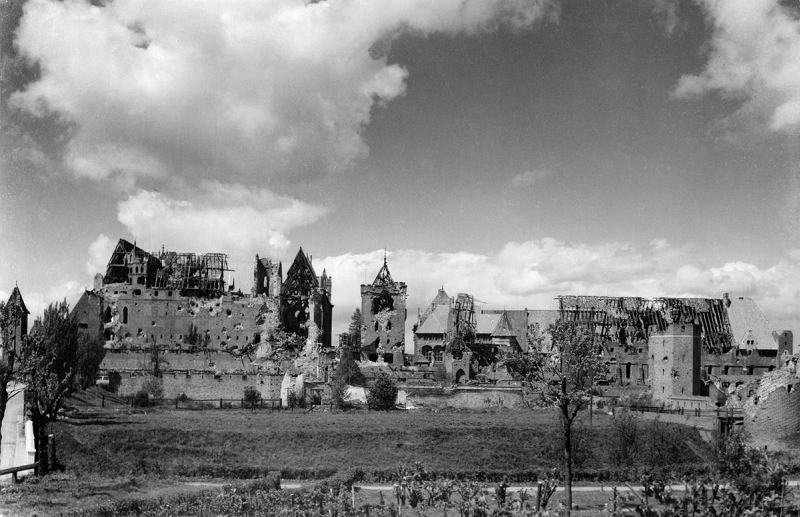
Ruins of the castle after the Second World War. Most of the brick outer walls remained intact

With the rise of Adolf Hitler to power in the early 1930s, the Nazis used the castle as a destination for annual pilgrimages of both the Hitler Youth and the League of German Girls. The Teutonic Castle at Marienburg served as a blueprint for the Order Castles of the Third Reich built under Hitler's reign. Between January 1945 and the retreat of the last German troops from the castle grounds on 9 March 1945, more than half the castle had been destroyed during fighting with Red Army forces.

In memory of the town's residents voting in favor of remaining part of Germany, after the First World War, a monument of a knight on a tall column was erected in front of the castle. The town was transferred to Poland in 1945. The column was cut in half. The upper part remains at the original location and now carries a statue of Mary, mother of Jesus, while the rest of the column can be found supporting a Saint Christopher statue in a monastery garden near St. John's church.

=== Restoration since 1962 ===
A severe fire in 1959 caused further damage to the castle.

In 1961 the Castle Museum (Muzeum Zamkowe) was founded, and in 1965 an amber exhibition was opened.

In a restoration ongoing since 1962, most of the castle has been reconstructed.

A significant 21st-century restoration is of the castle's principal church, which is dedicated to the Blessed Virgin Mary. This had been restored just before the Second World War and then largely destroyed in the fighting of 1945. It remained in a state of disrepair until a new restoration was completed in April 2016.

Malbork Castle remains the largest brick complex in Europe.

== Burials in the mausoleum under the Chapel of St. Anne ==
- Dietrich von Altenburg (r. 1335–1341)
- Heinrich Dusemer (r. 1345–1351)
- Winrich von Kniprode (r. 1351–1382)
- Konrad von Jungingen (r. 1394–1407)
- Michael Küchmeister von Sternberg (r. 1414–1422)
- Konrad von Erlichshausen (r. 1441–1449)

== Gallery ==
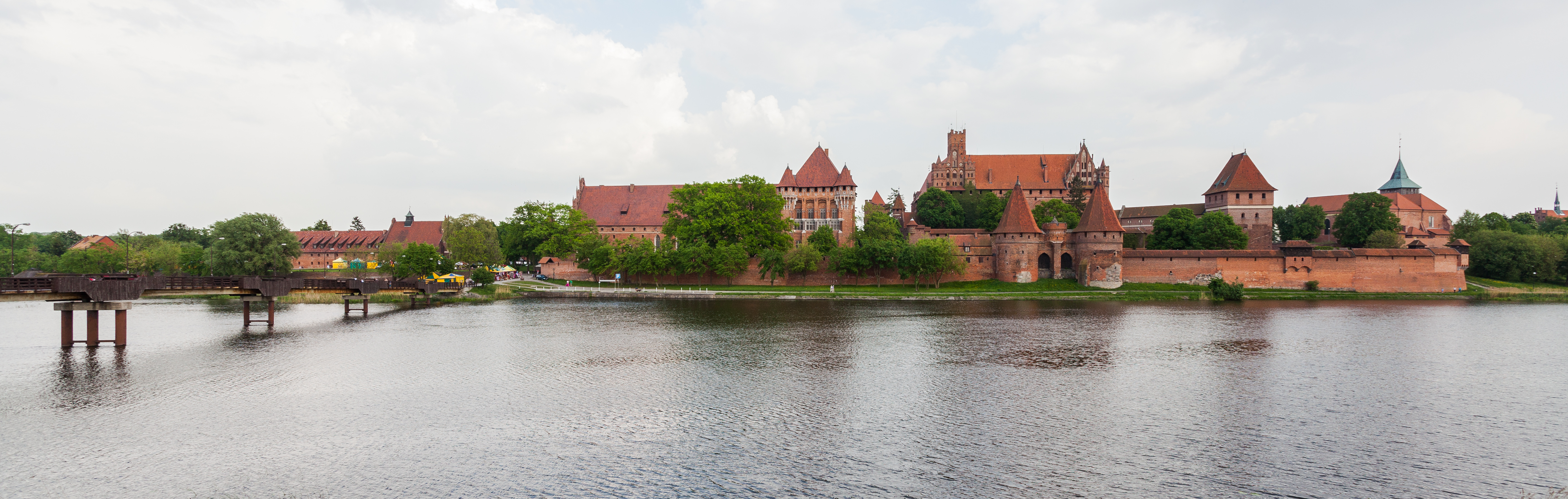
General view

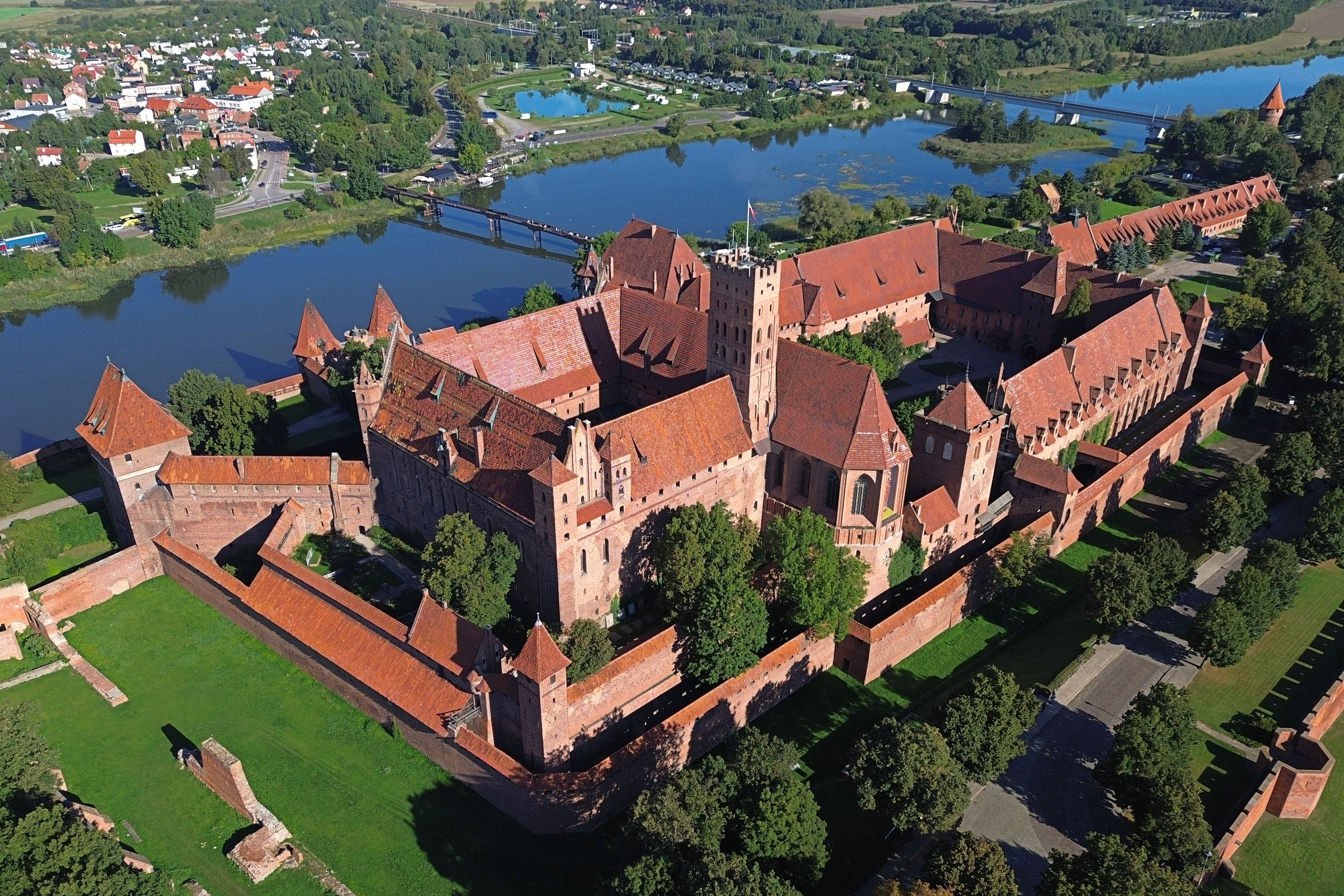
Aerial photo of High and Middle Castle

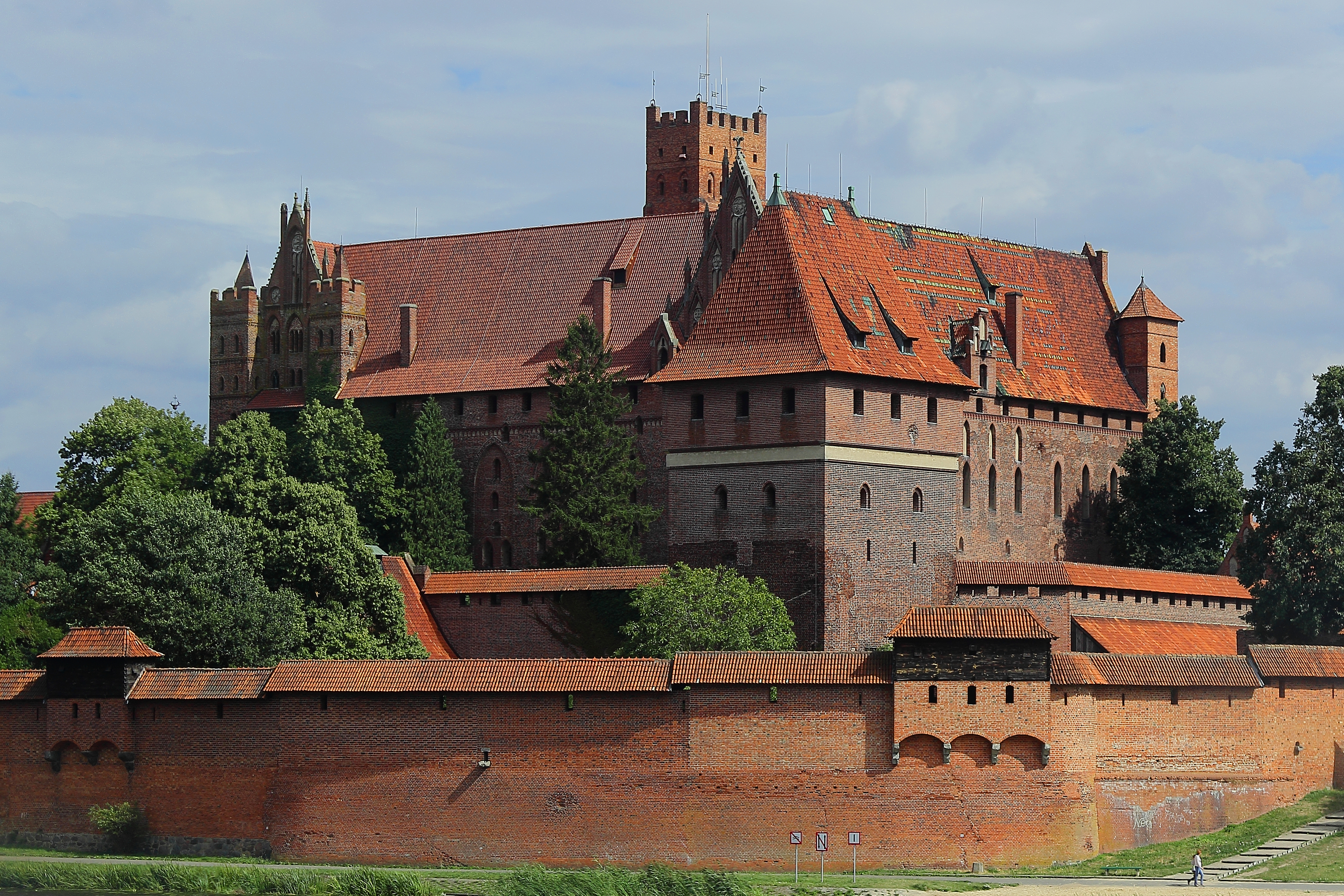
High Castle, view from the west

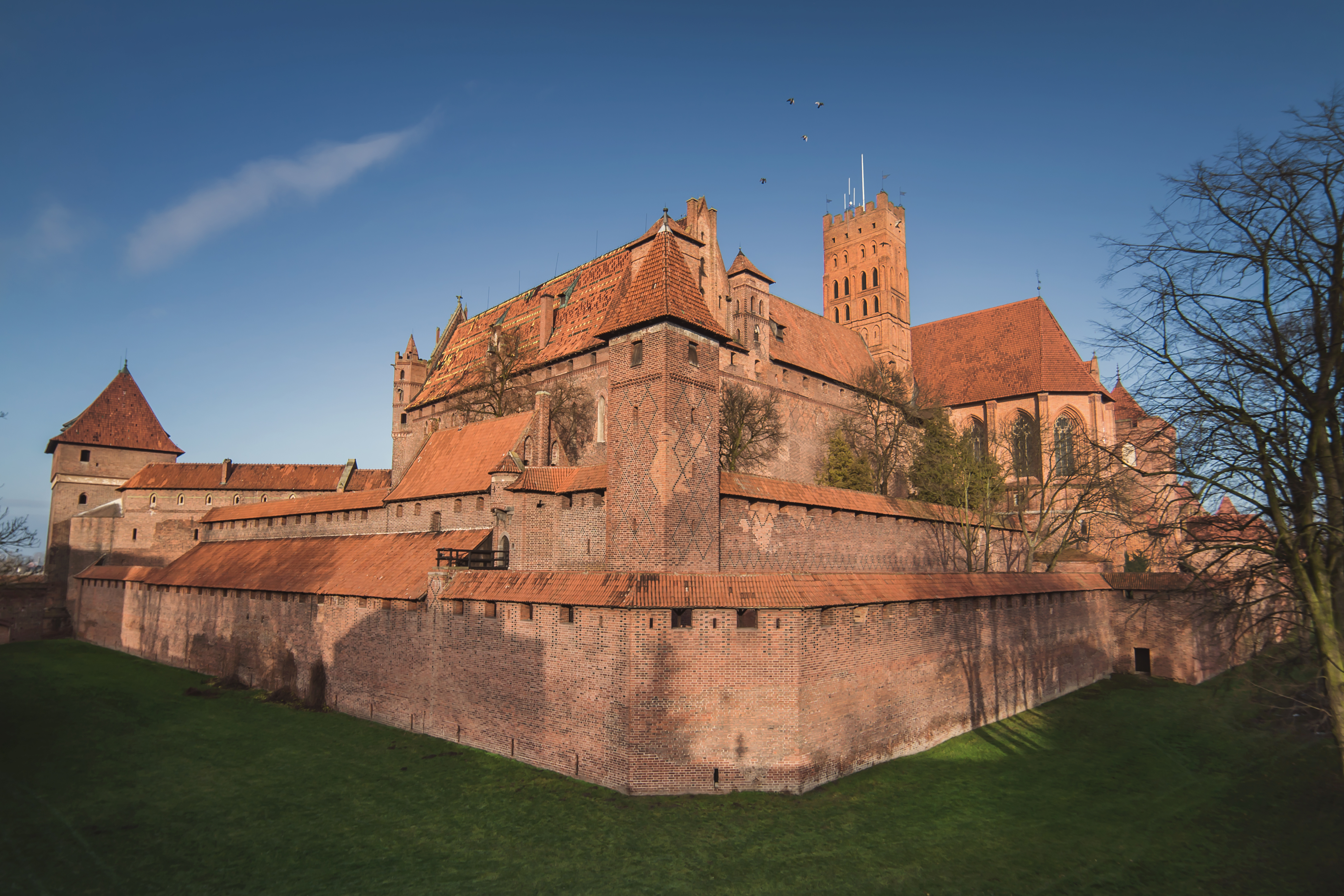
High Castle, view from the south

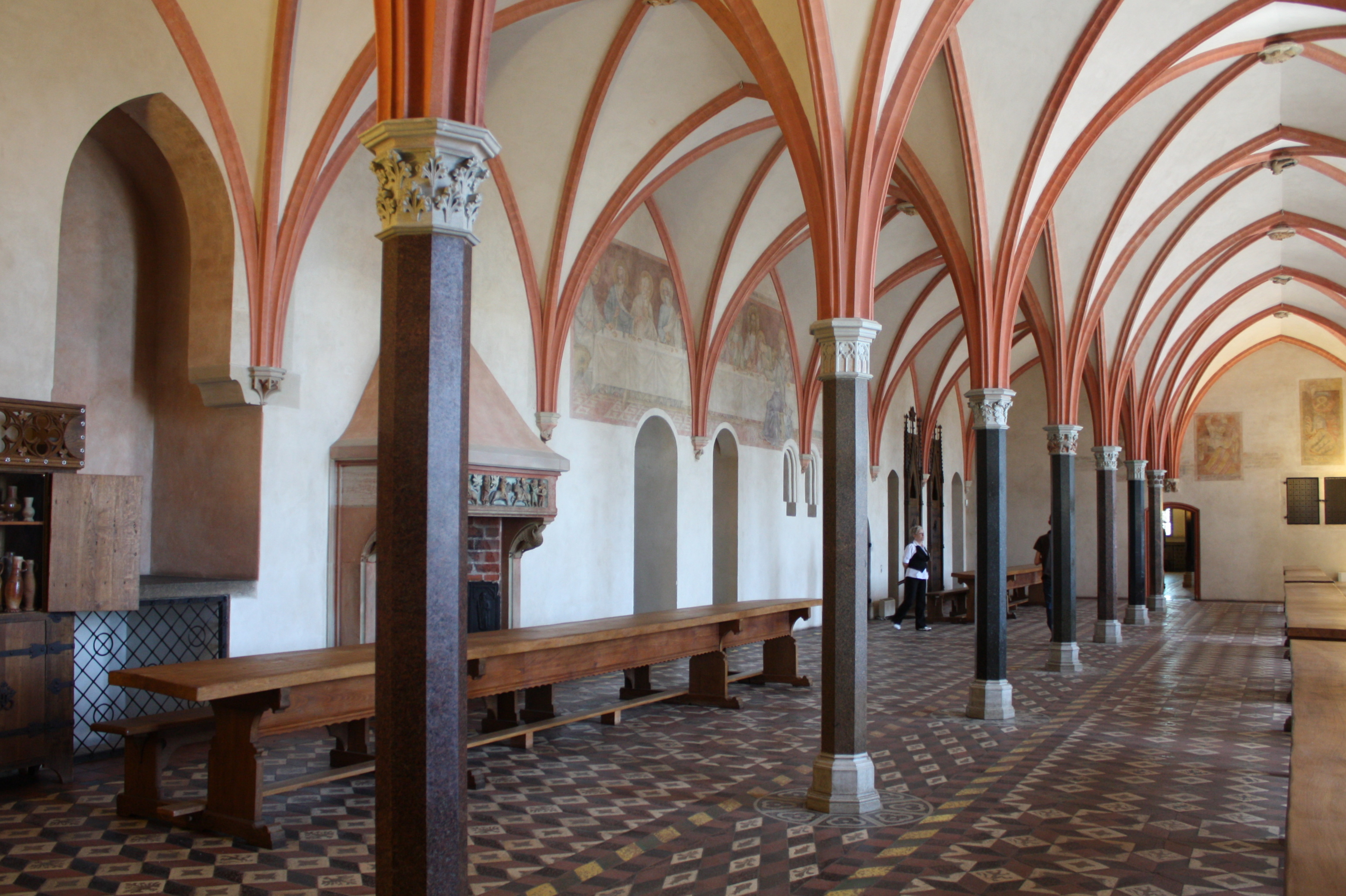
High Castle, convent refectory

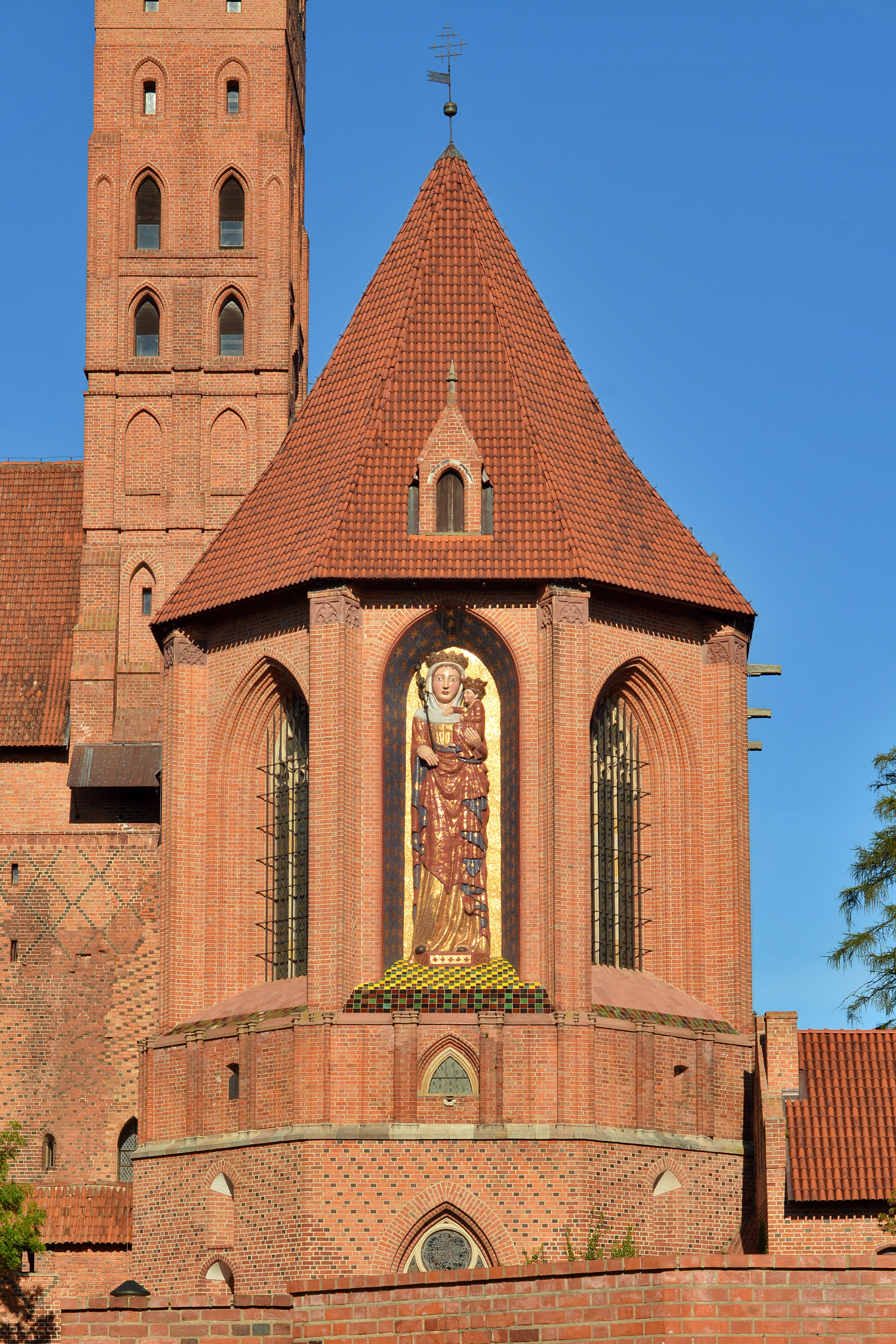
High Castle, restored statue of St Mary outside the castle church

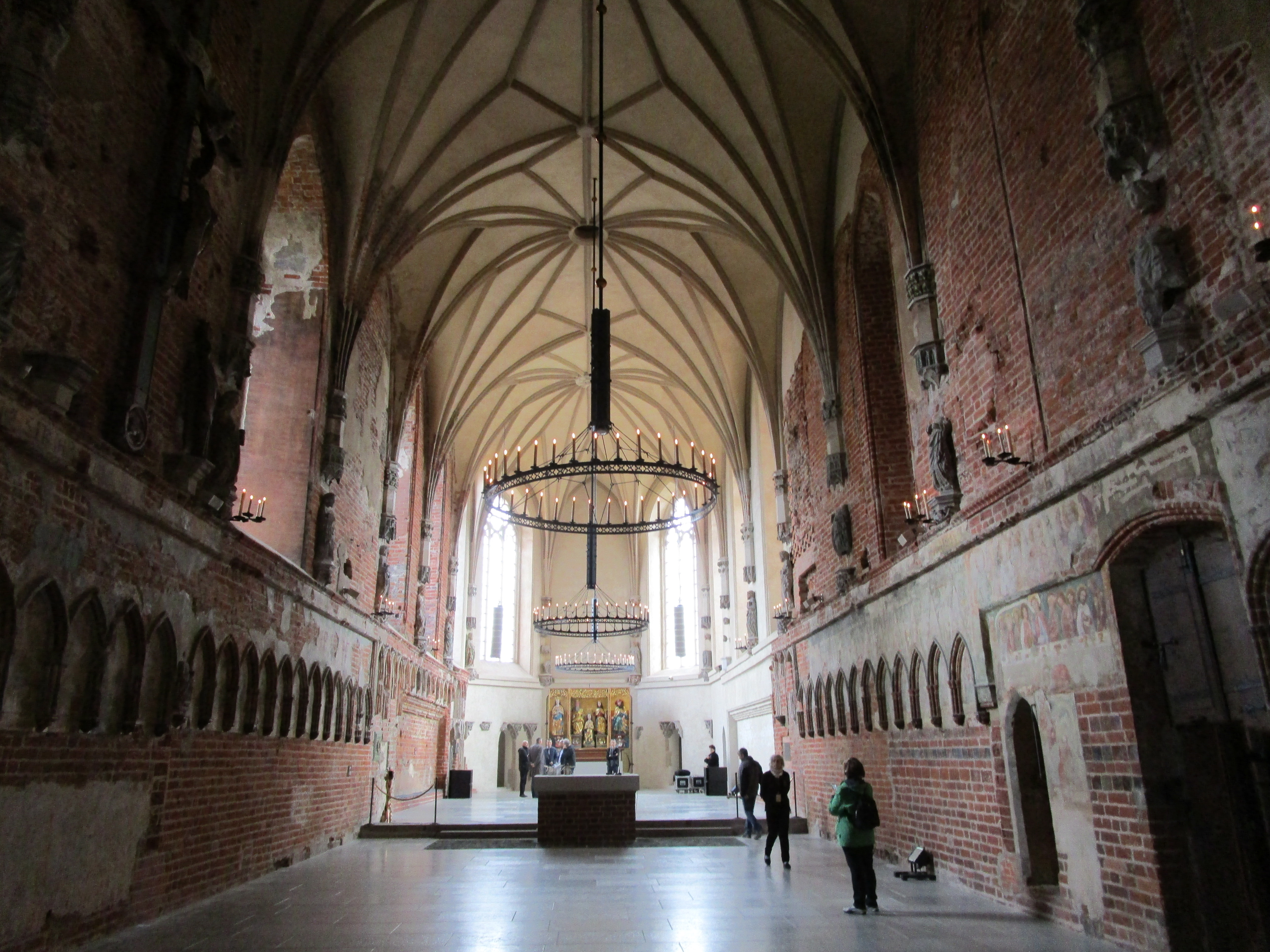
High Castle, interior of St Anne's Chapel

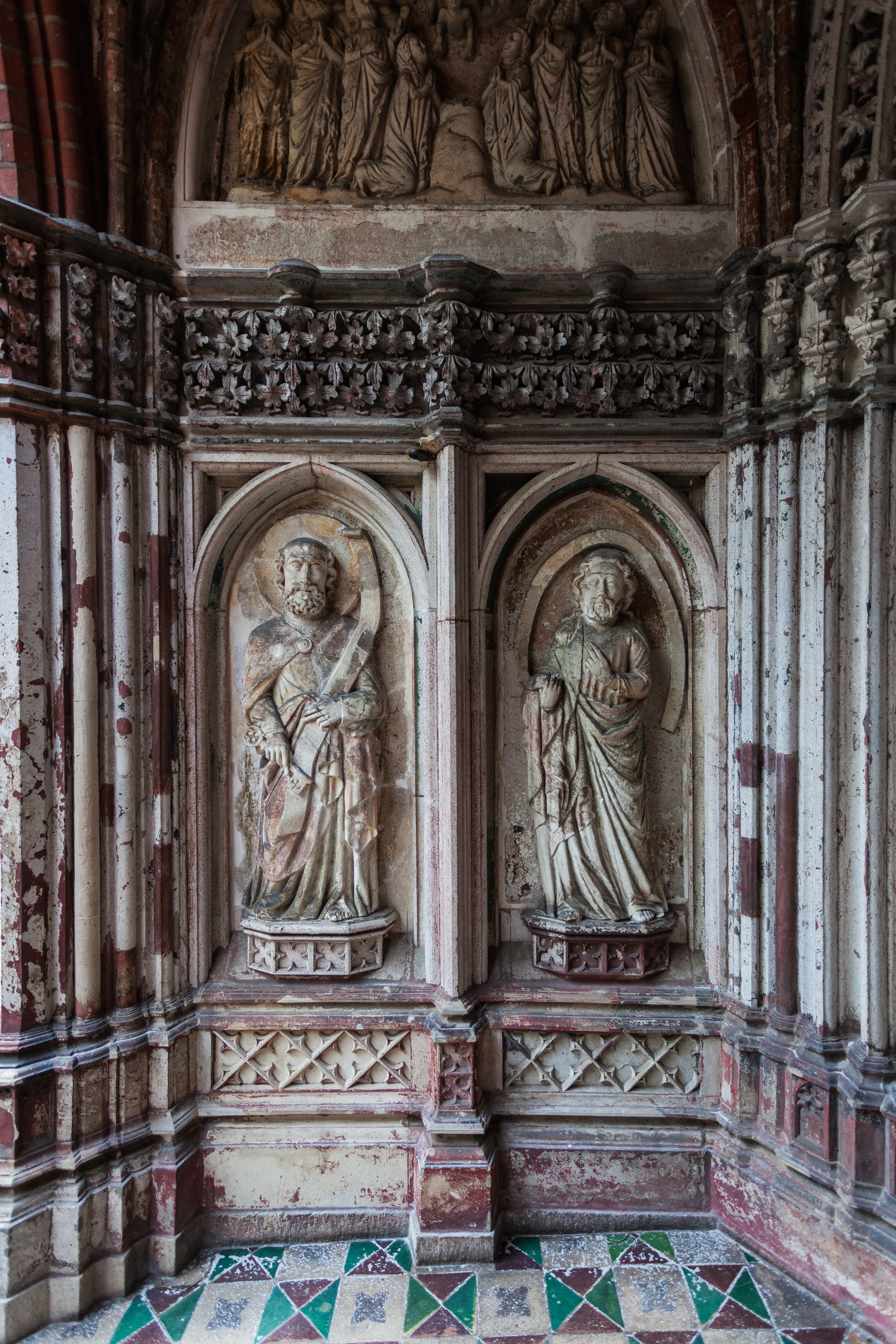
High Castle, sculptures at the entrance of St Anne's Chapel

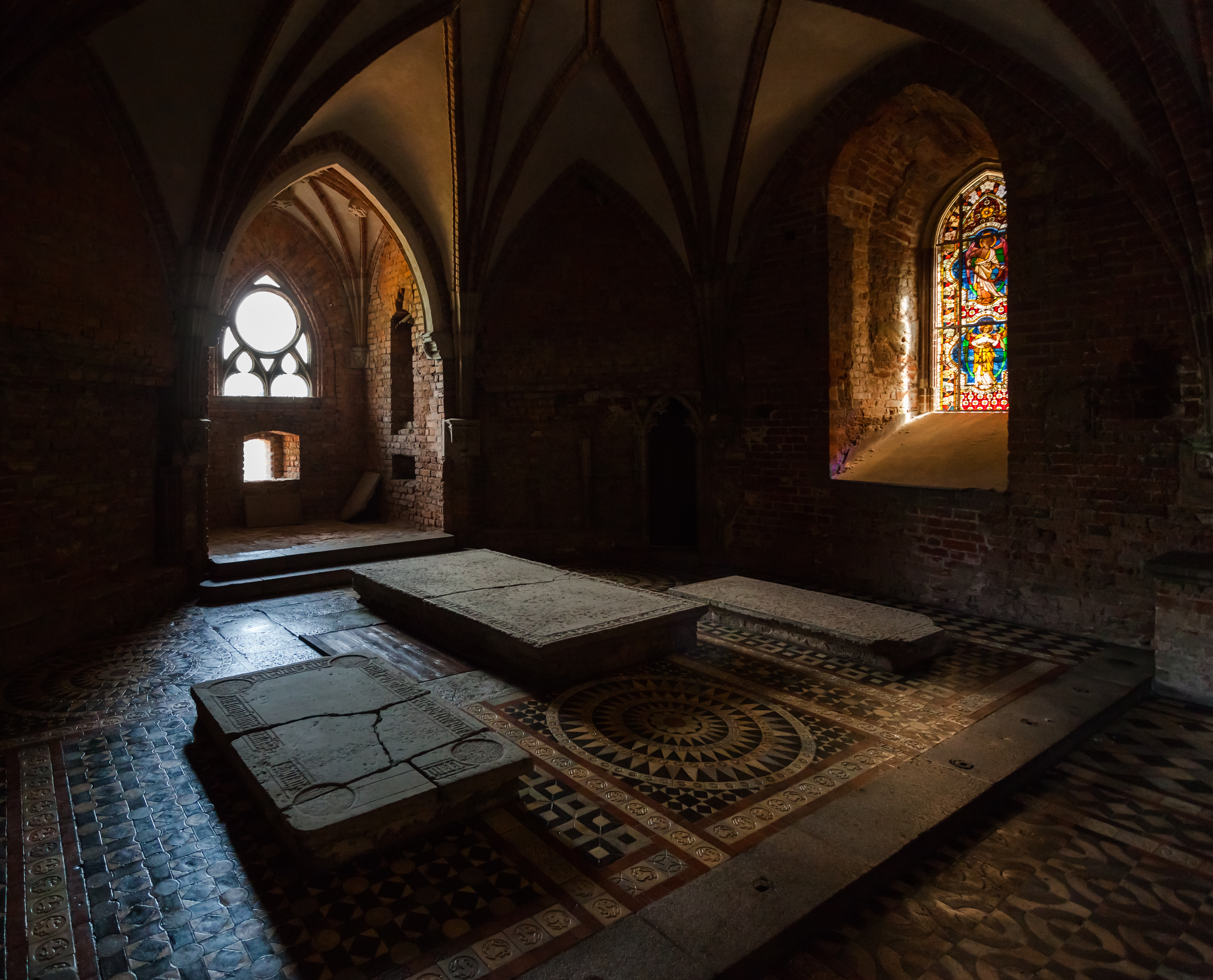
High Castle, gravestones in St Anne's Chapel

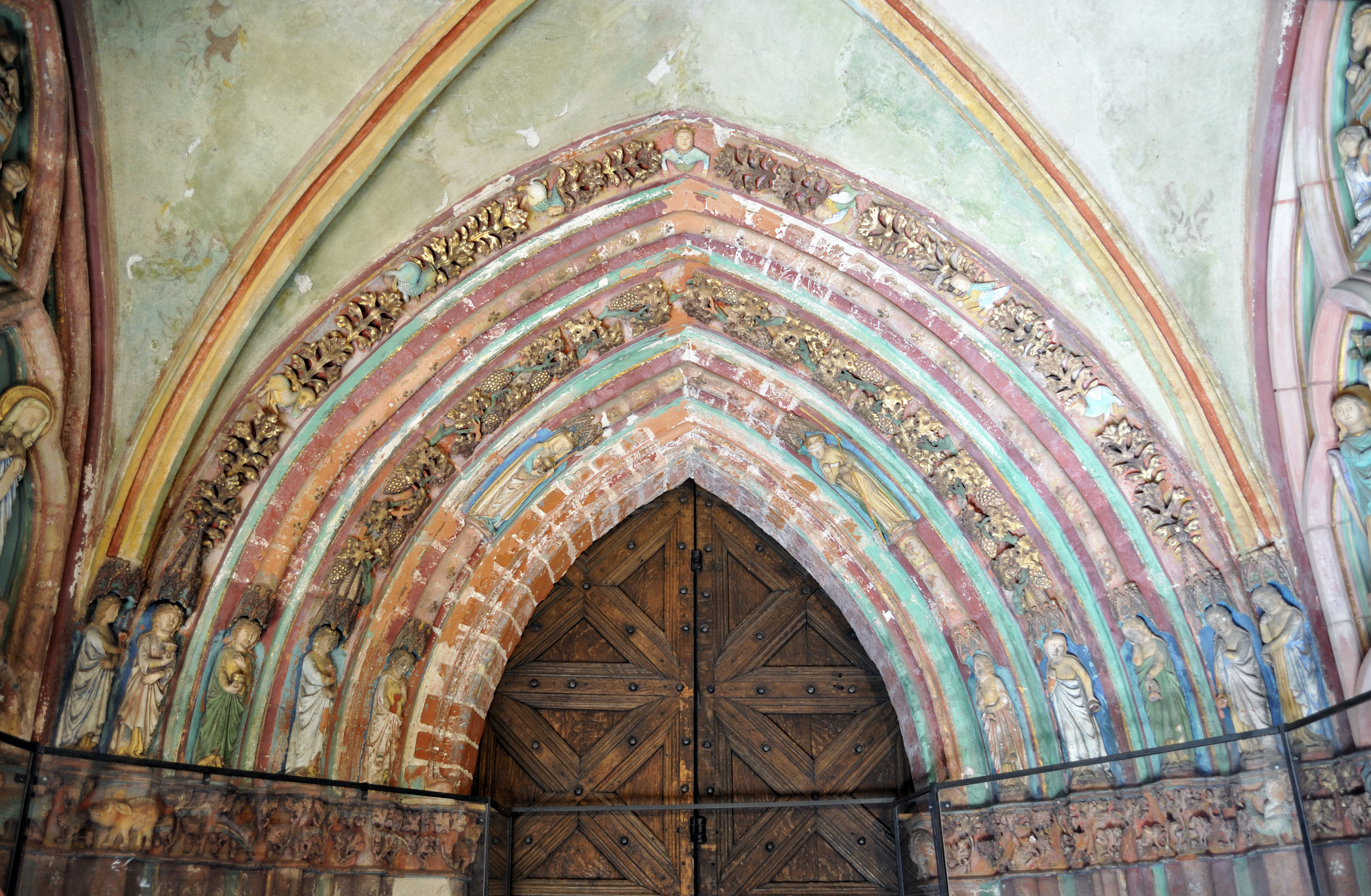
High Castle, entrance to the church, so-called Golden Gate

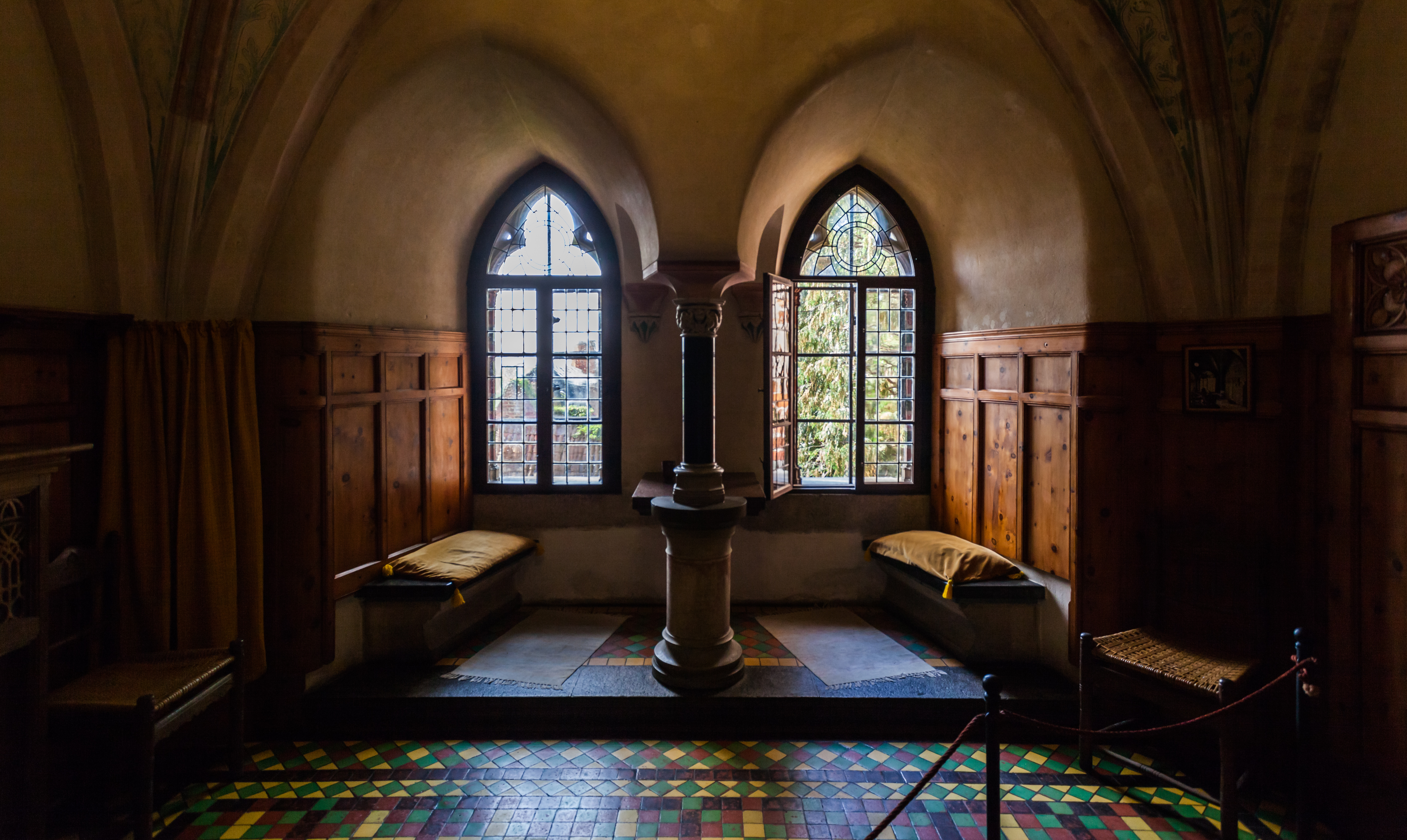
High Castle, windows in one of the rooms

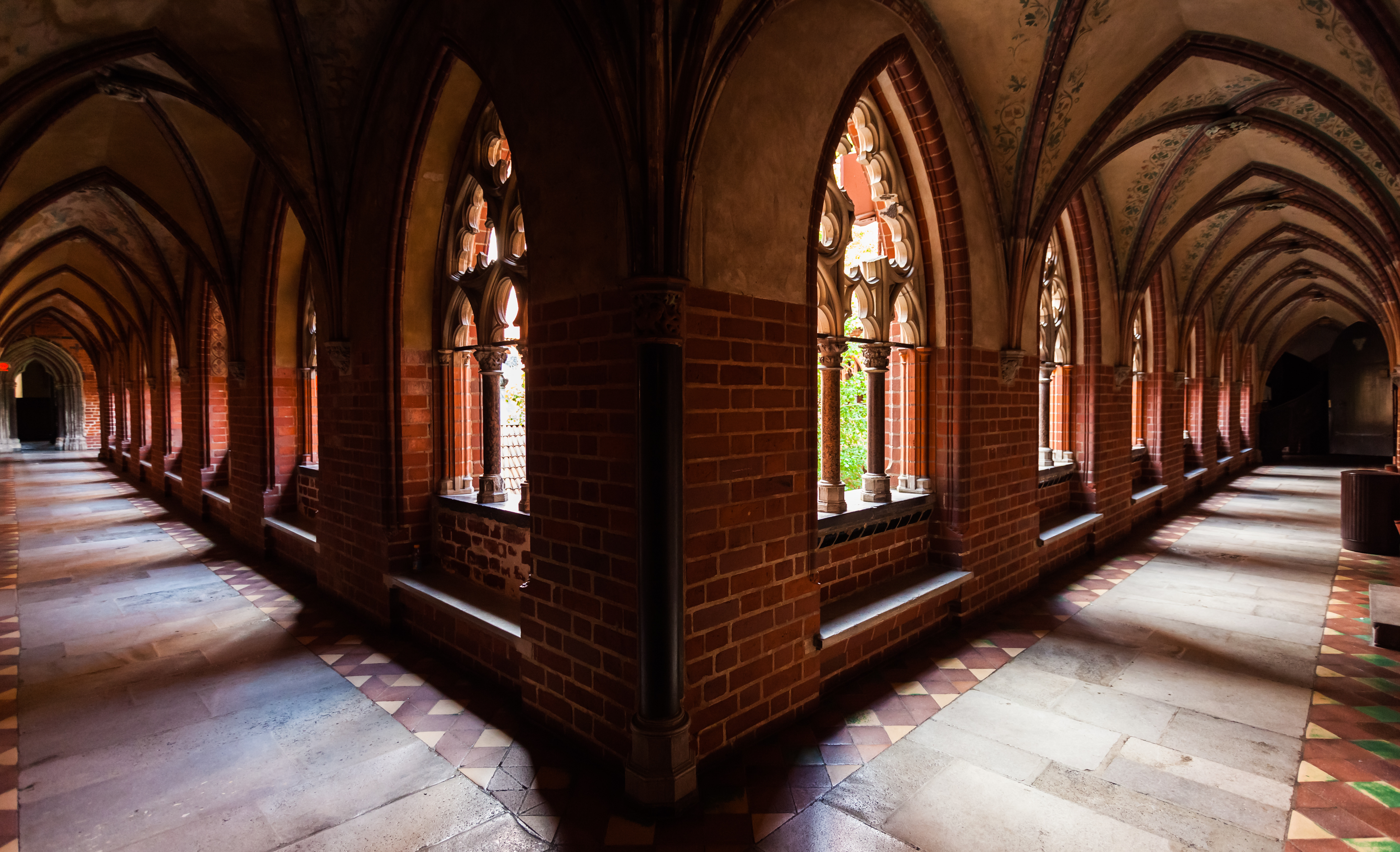
High Castle, cloister corridors

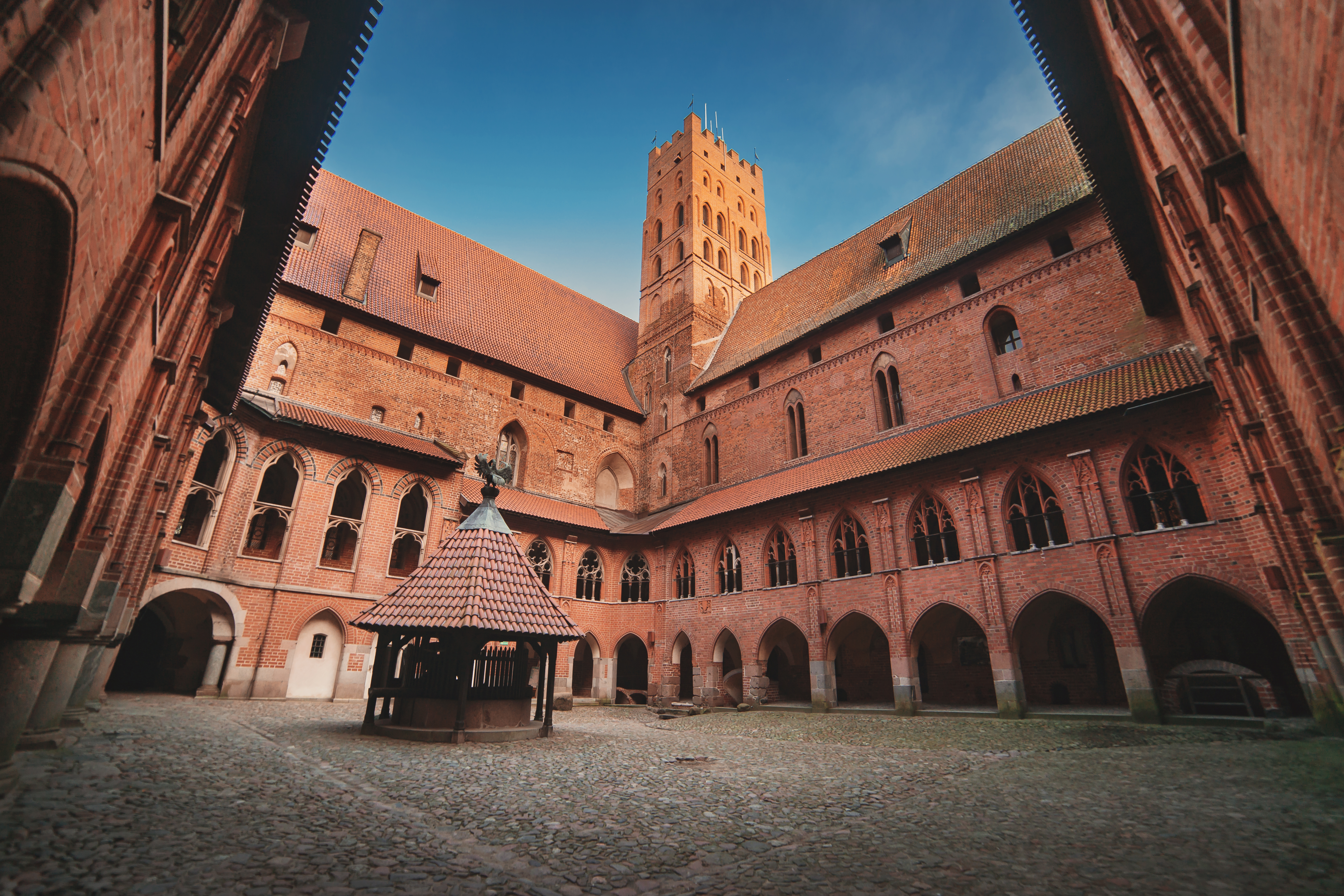
High Castle, courtyard

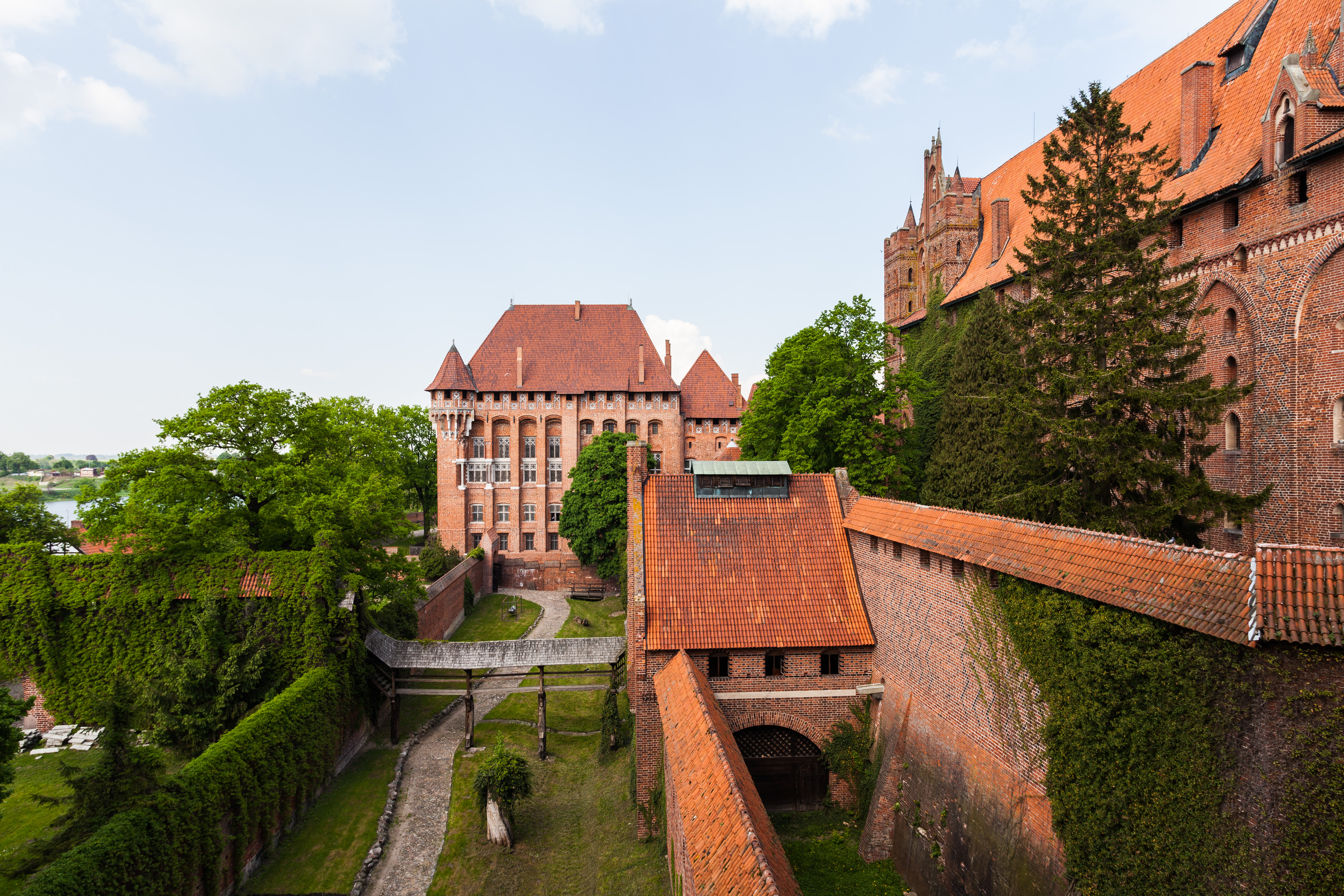
View from the High Castle to the Grand Masters' Palace

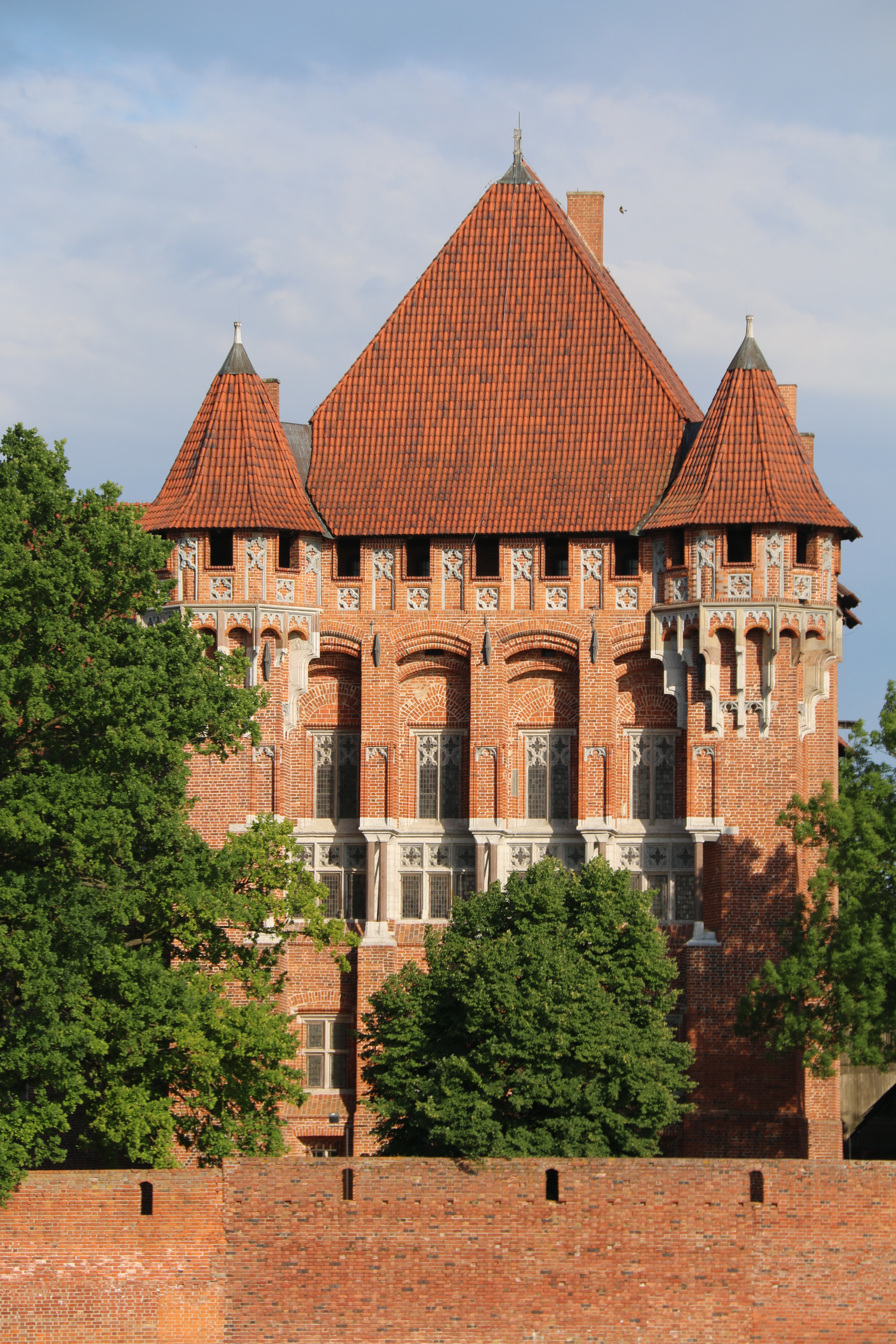
Middle Castle, Grand Masters' Palace, northwestern facade

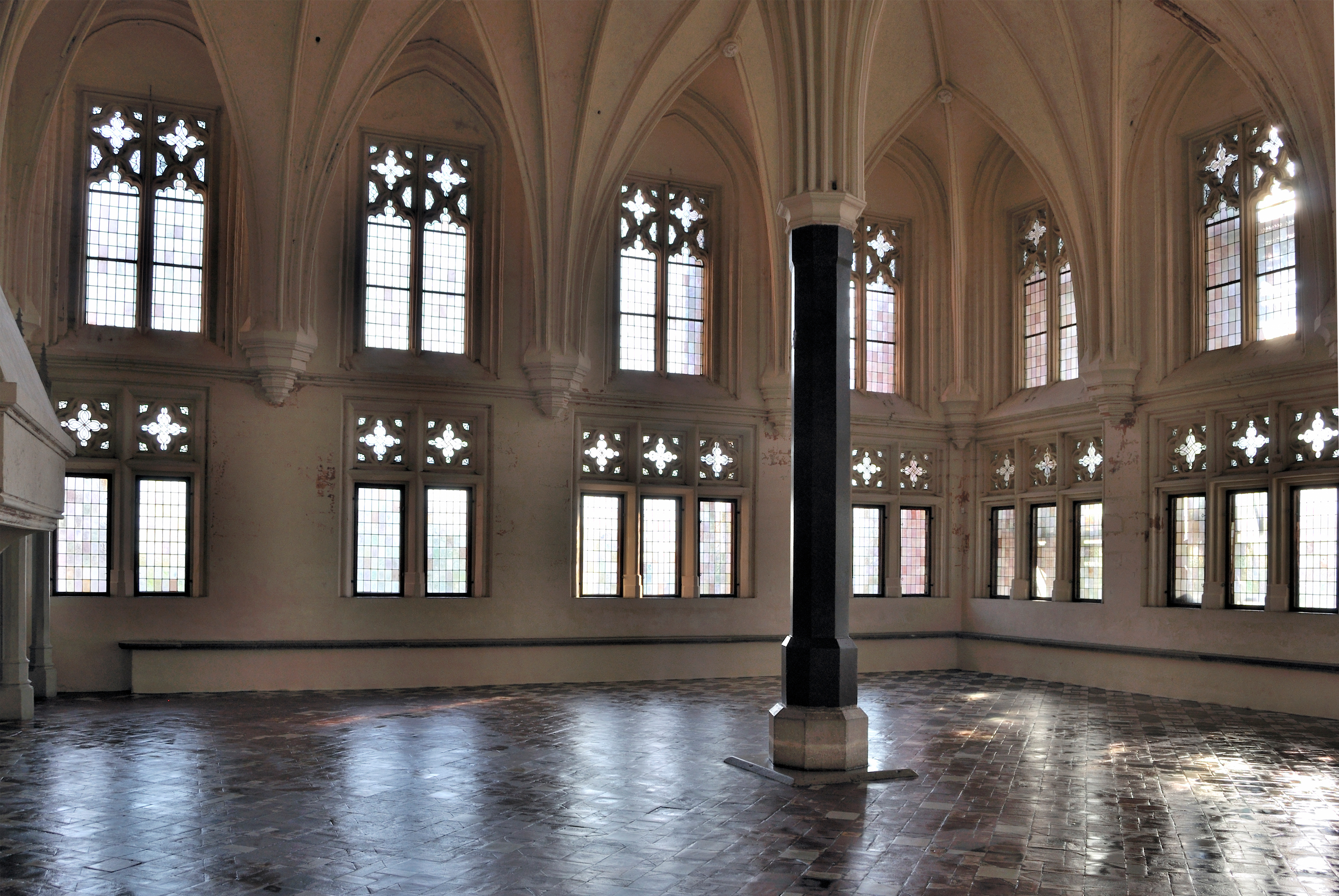
Middle Castle, Grand Masters' Palace, summer refectory

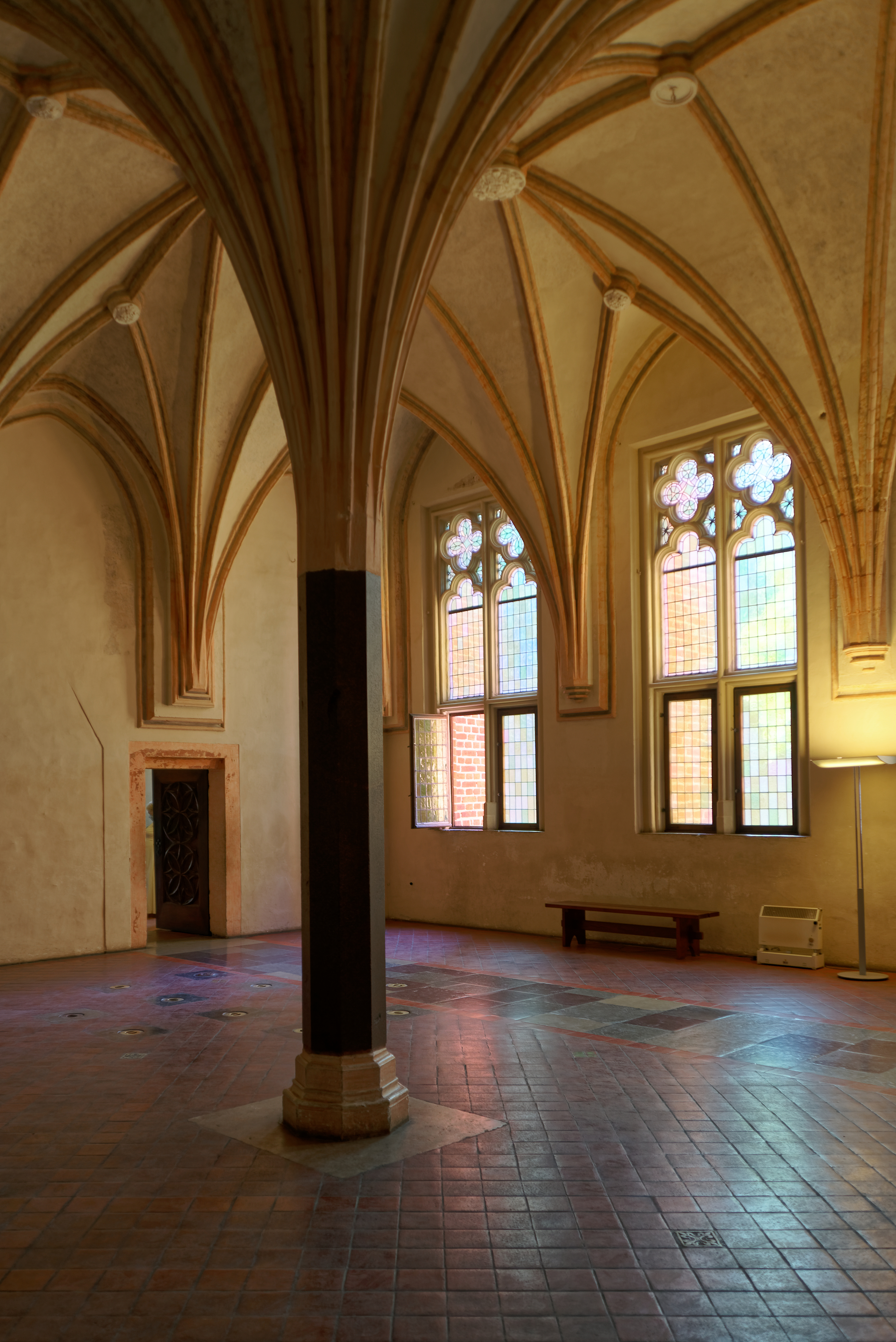
Middle Castle, Grand Masters' Palace, winter refectory

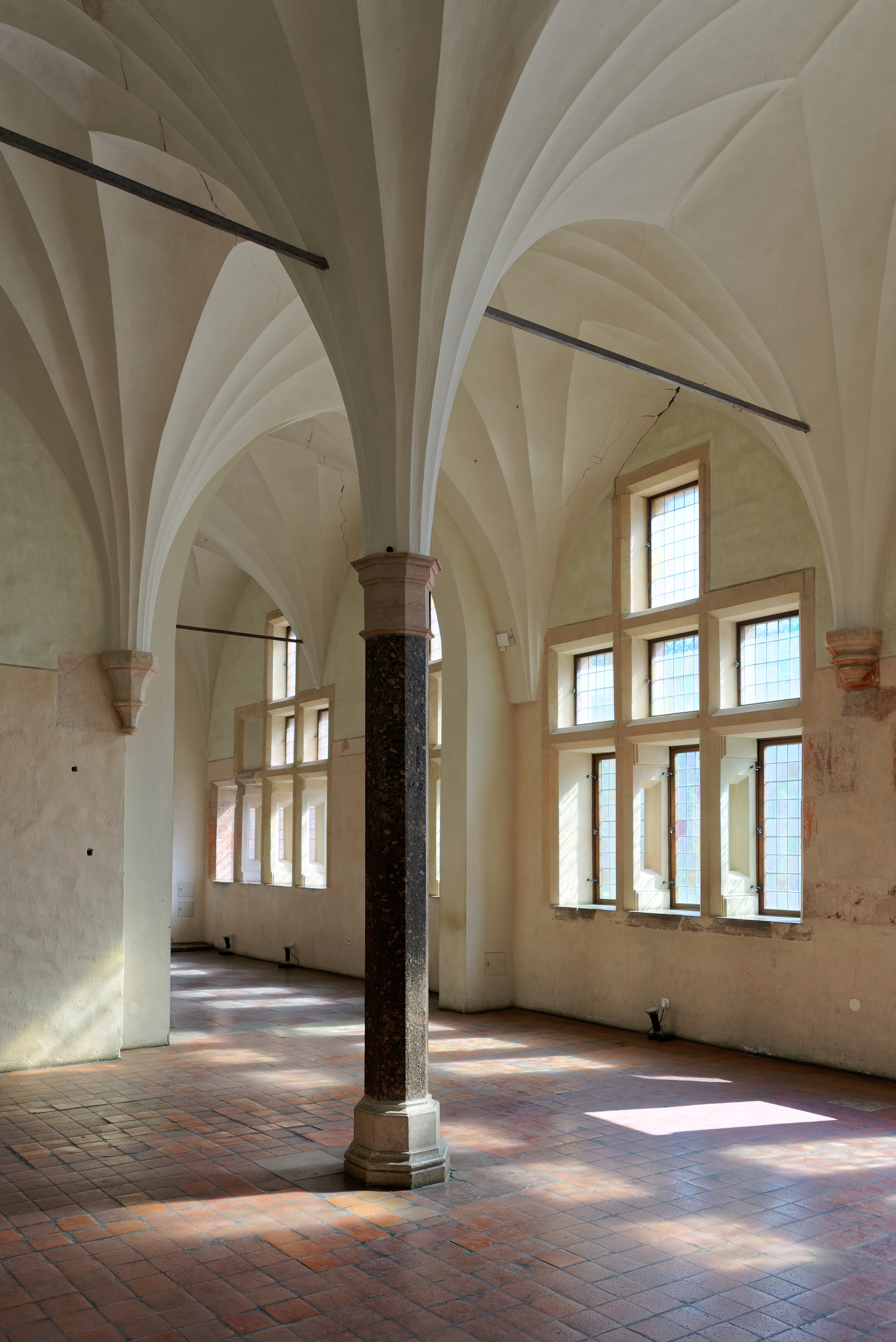
Middle Castle, Grand Masters' Palace, entrance hall

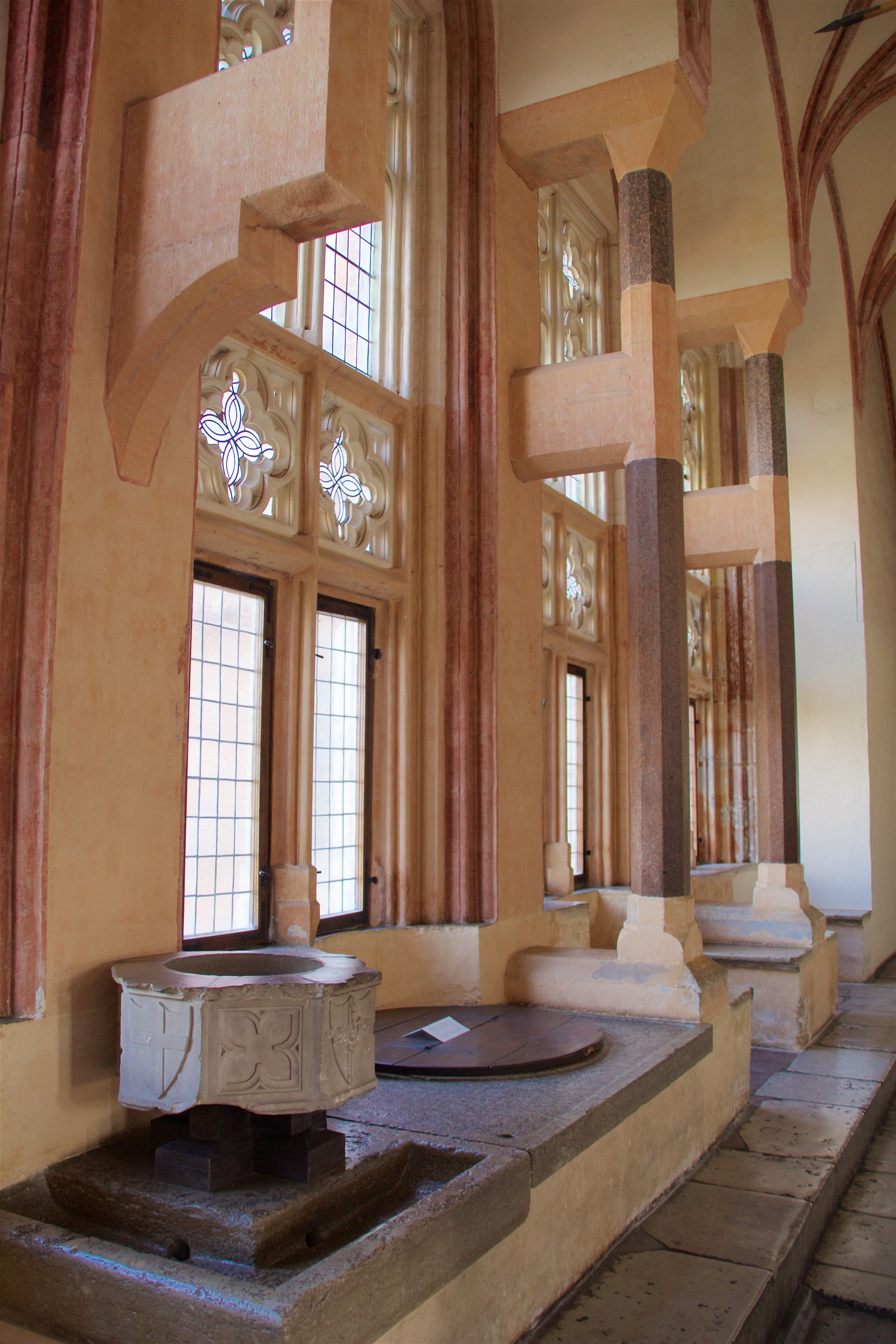
Middle Castle, Grand Masters' Palace, high hall

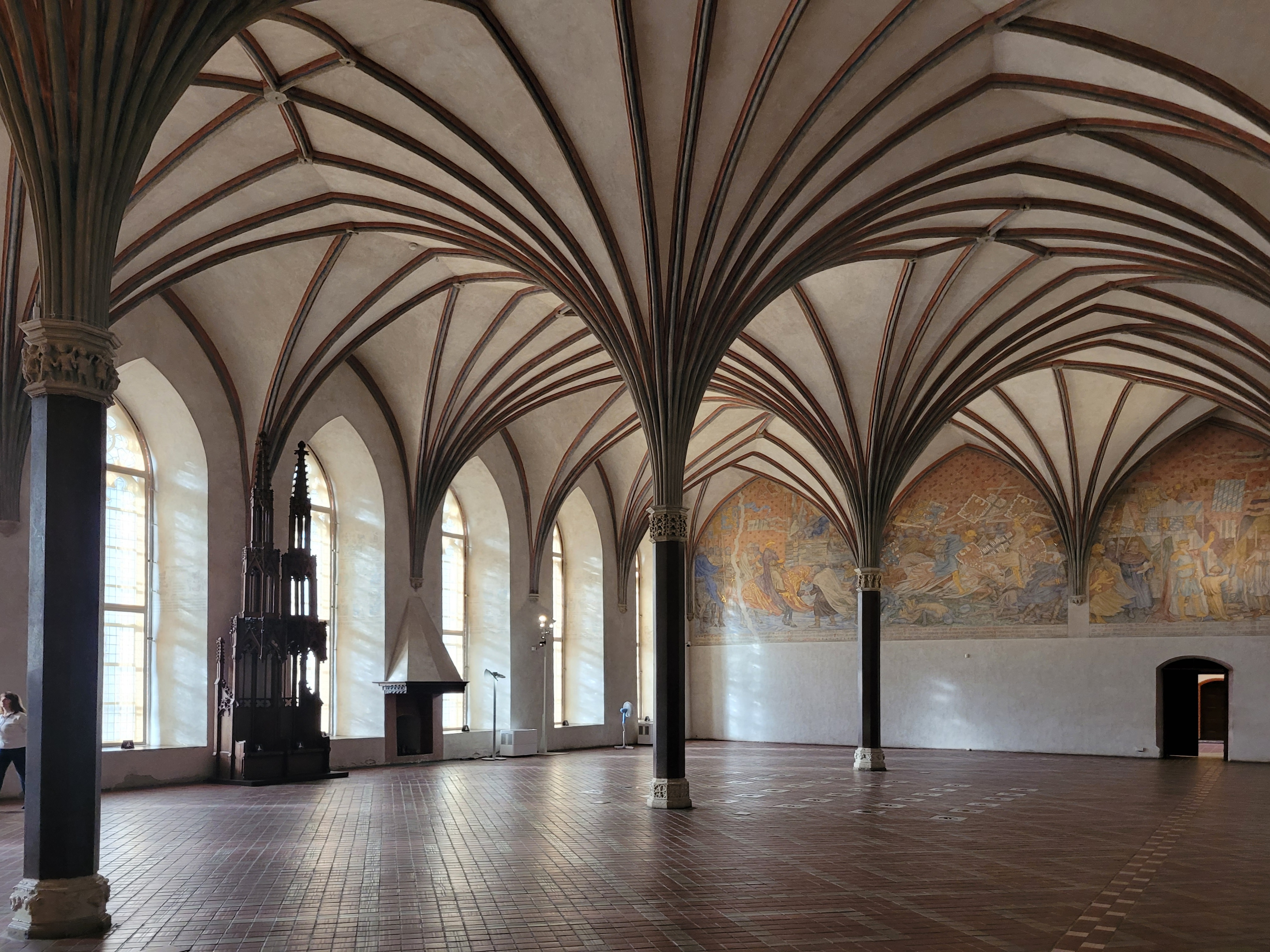
Middle Castle, grand refectory

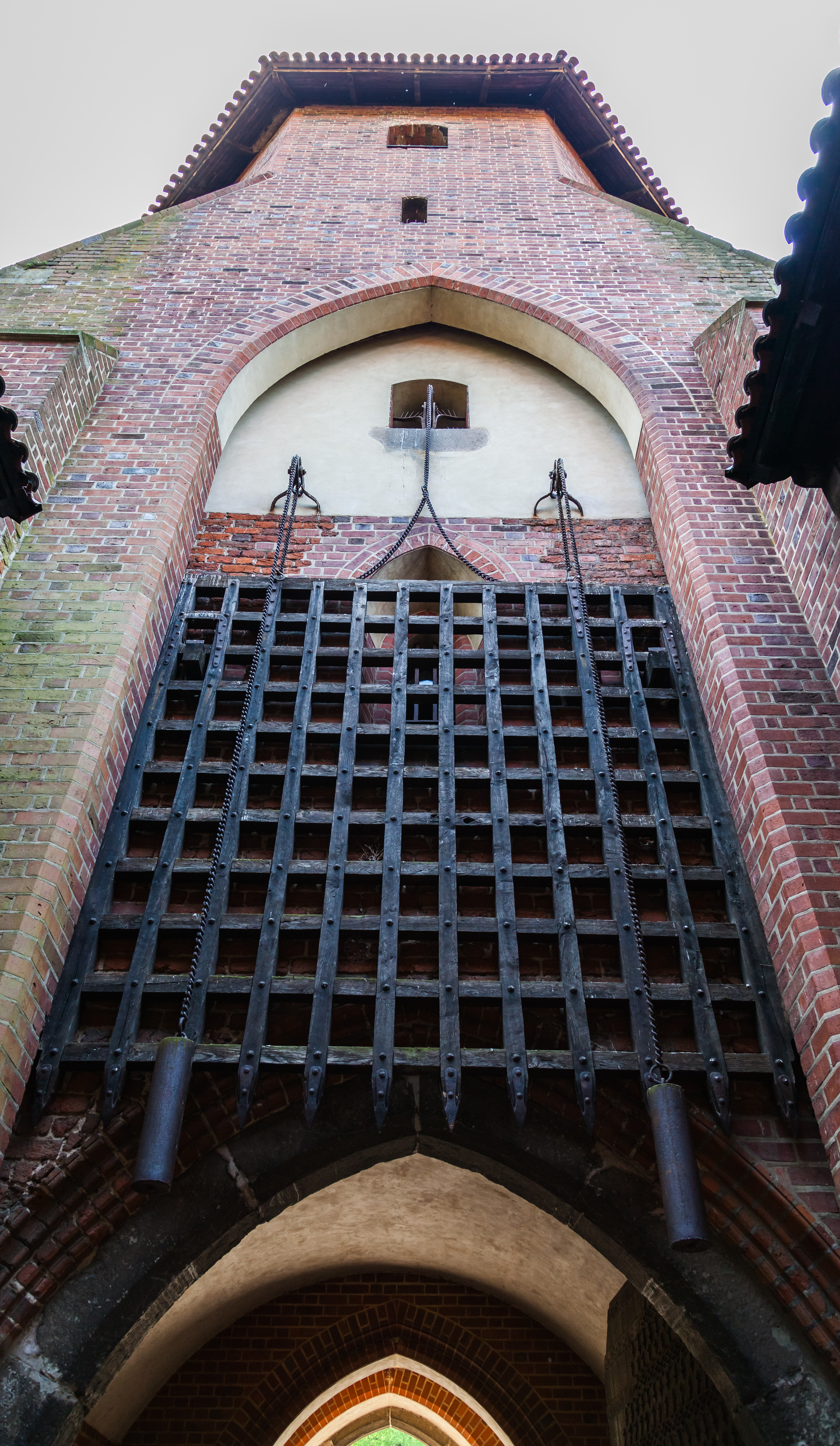
Gate to the Middle Castle

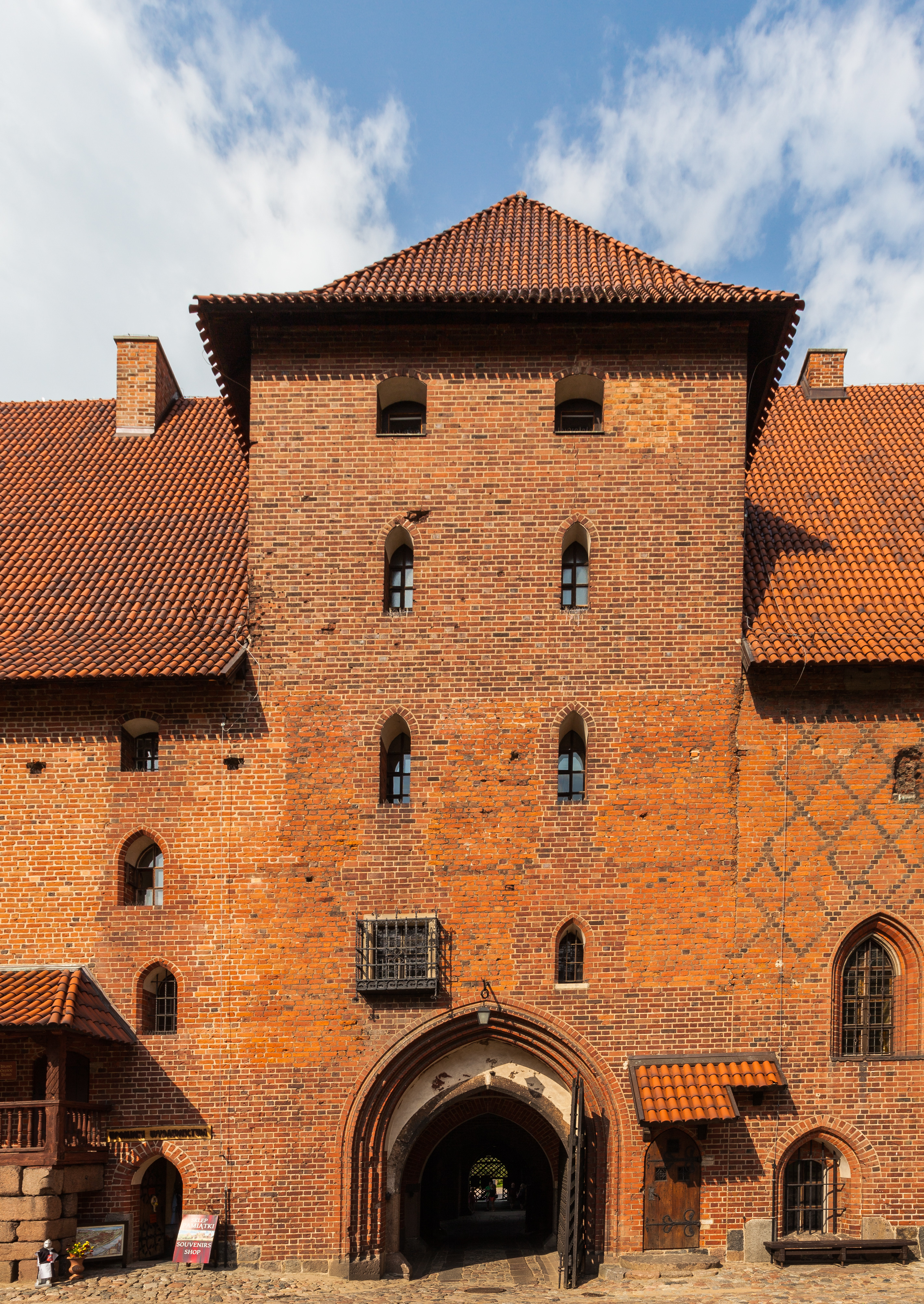
Middle Castle, the tower in the northern wing with the entrance

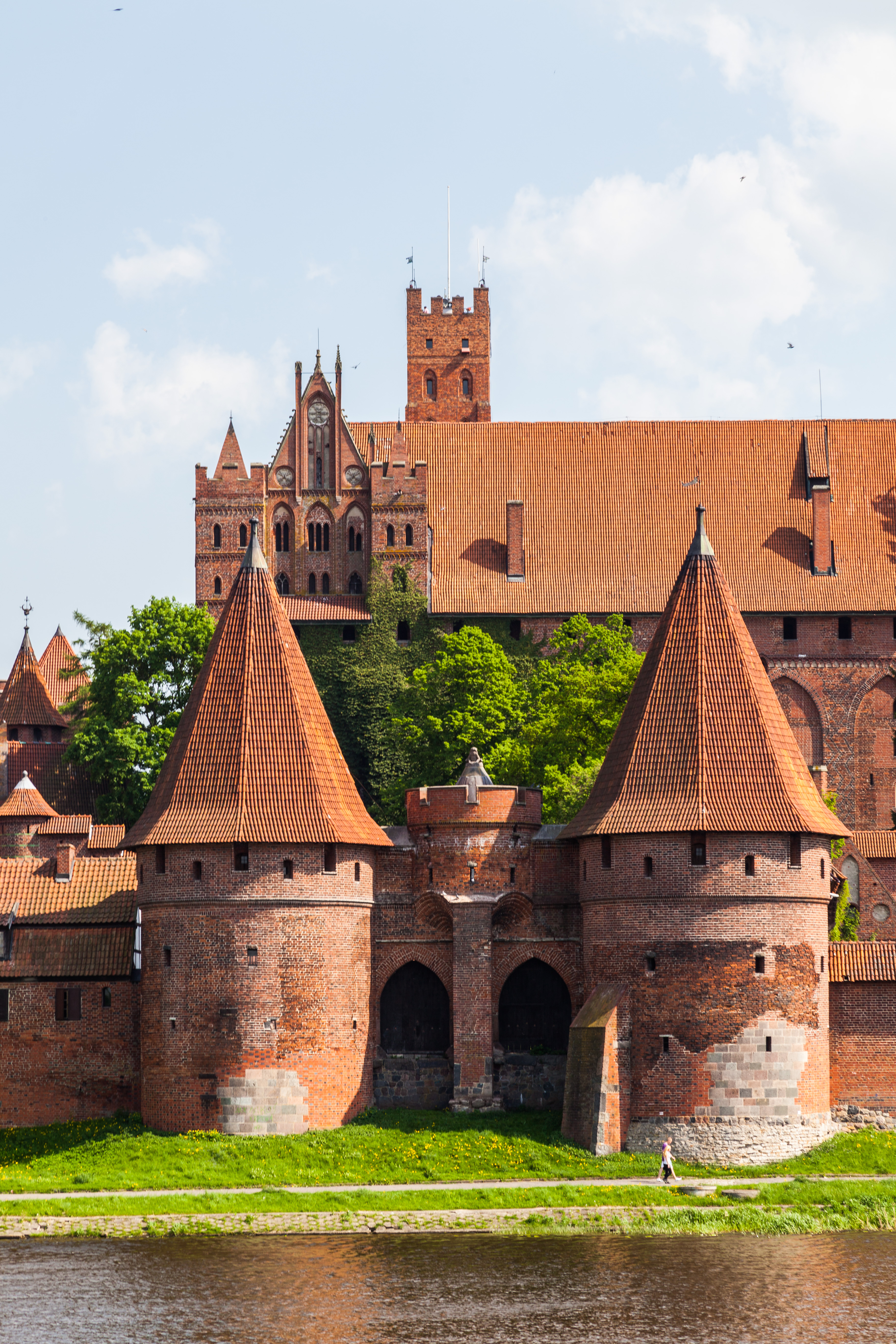
Exterior view of Bridge Gate, in 14th century main entrance to the castle

== See also ==
- Trakai Island Castle, similar architecture
- List of castles in Poland
- List of World Heritage Sites in Poland
- List of tallest structures built before the 20th century

== Bibliography ==
- Boockmann, Hartmut (1992). "Deutsche Geschichte im Osten Europas". Ostpreußen und Westpreußen (in German). Berlin: Siedler Verlag. ISBN 3-88680-212-4.
- Emery, Anthony (2007). "Malbork Castle – Poland" (PDF). The Castle Studies Group Journal. 21: 138–156.
- Załęski, Stanisław (1908). Jezuici w Polsce. W skróceniu, 5 tomów w jednym, z dwoma mapami (in Polish). Kraków: W. L. Anczyc i Sp.
- Shirer, William Lawrence (1960). The Rise and Fall of the Third Reich: A History of Nazi Germany. New York City: Simon & Schuster. ASIN B000EA3XL4. LCCN 60006729. OCLC 1286630. OL 5794925M. Wikidata Q138029595.
