= Dietrich von Altenburg =

19th Grandmaster of the Teutonic Order

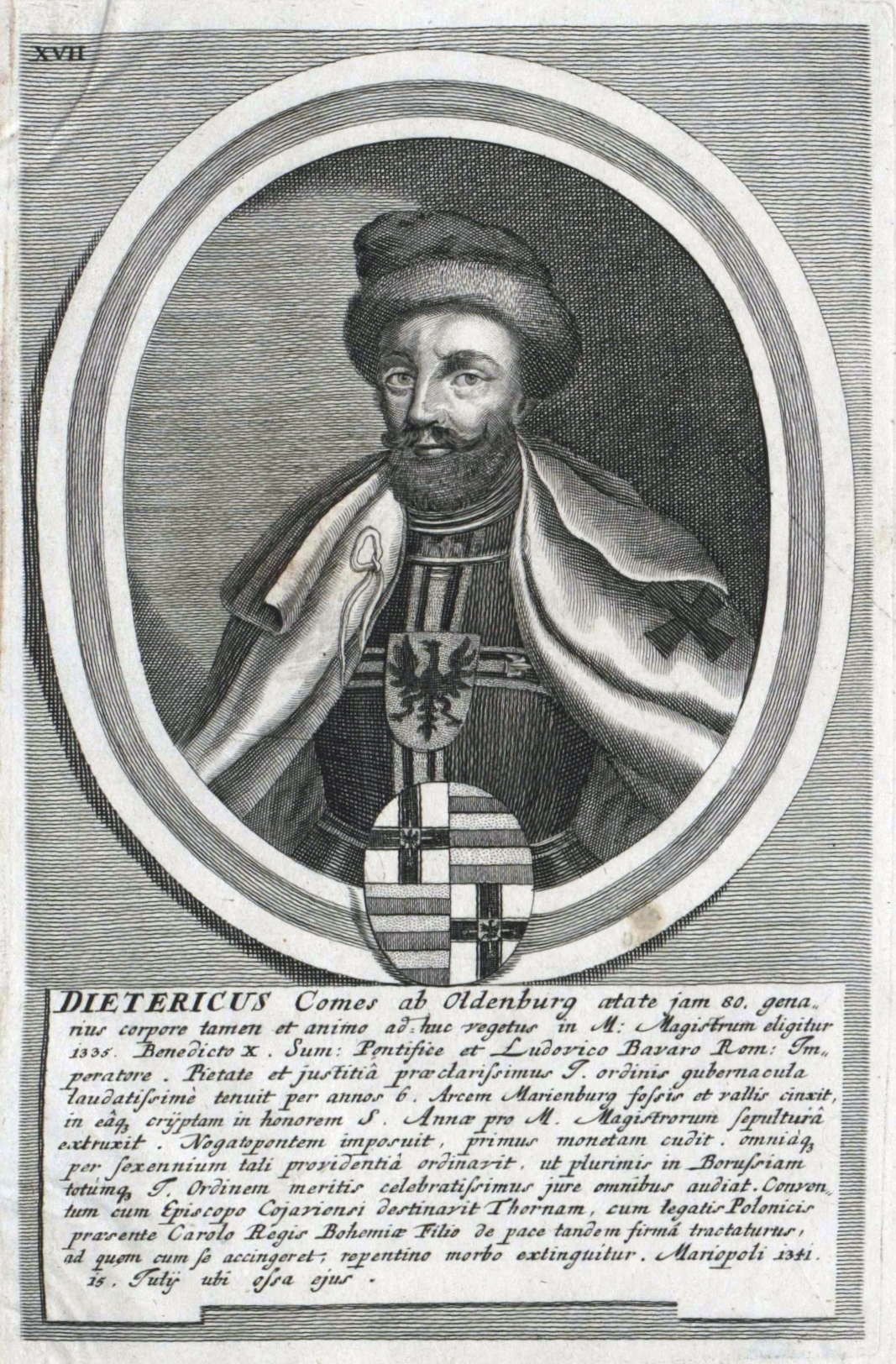
Dietrich von Altenburg

Grand Master's coat of arms

Dietrich von Altenburg was the 19th Grand Master of the Teutonic Knights, serving from 1335 to 1341.

He came from the Thuringian town of Altenburg in the Holy Roman Empire, where his father held the office of a burgrave of the immediate Pleissnerland, which however had long been pawned to the Saxon House of Wettin. Altenburg joined the Order in 1307 and served as Komtur of Ragnit (1320–24) and of Balga (1326–31). In 1331 he was appointed Grand Marshal of the Order, and resumed the Polish–Teutonic War smouldering since 1326. After the Battle of Płowce, the Order conquered the former Duchy of Kuyavia with Dobrzyń Land from the Kingdom of Poland under Władysław I the Elbow-high.

Altenburg was accused before a papal tribunal of alleged crimes committed during the Kuyavian campaign. Nevertheless, the relations with Poland improved upon the accession of King Casimir III the Great in 1333 and the election of well-disposed Pope Benedict XII the next year. At the 1335 Congress of Visegrád, by the agency of King John of Bohemia, an agreement was made, whereafter the Polish king would renounce Pomerelia in favour of the Order and in turn regain Kuyavia and Dobrzyń. The arrangement however met with protest by the Polish szlachta, and a final peace was not achieved until 1343 by the Treaty of Kalisz.

After Altenburg was elected as Grand Master of the Teutonic Knights, he set about building or reconstructing many of the Order's castles. He began the reconstruction of the Church of the Blessed Virgin Mary at Marienburg, including the building of the main tower, and commissioned a mosaic figure of the Madonna. The Chapel of Saint Anne, the first permanent bridge over the Nogat, and the Bridge Gate were also completed during his time in office.

Meanwhile, the conflict with Poland as well as the papal proceedings lingered on. Despite an intervention by the Emperor Louis IV, in 1339 the Roman Curia sentenced the Order to surrender all estates claimed by Poland, a judgement that however was not approved by the Pope. Intending to negotiate with Poland, in 1341 Altenburg traveled to Thorn (Toruń), but died there from an illness in October of that year. He was the first Grand Master to be buried in the Chapel of Saint Anne in Marienburg; his original gravestone can still be seen there to this day.

Grand Master of the Teutonic Order
Preceded by Luther von Braunschweig	Hochmeister; 1335–1341	Succeeded by Ludolf König
