= Prussian Homage =

1525 investiture of Albert of Prussia as a fief of the Kingdom of Poland

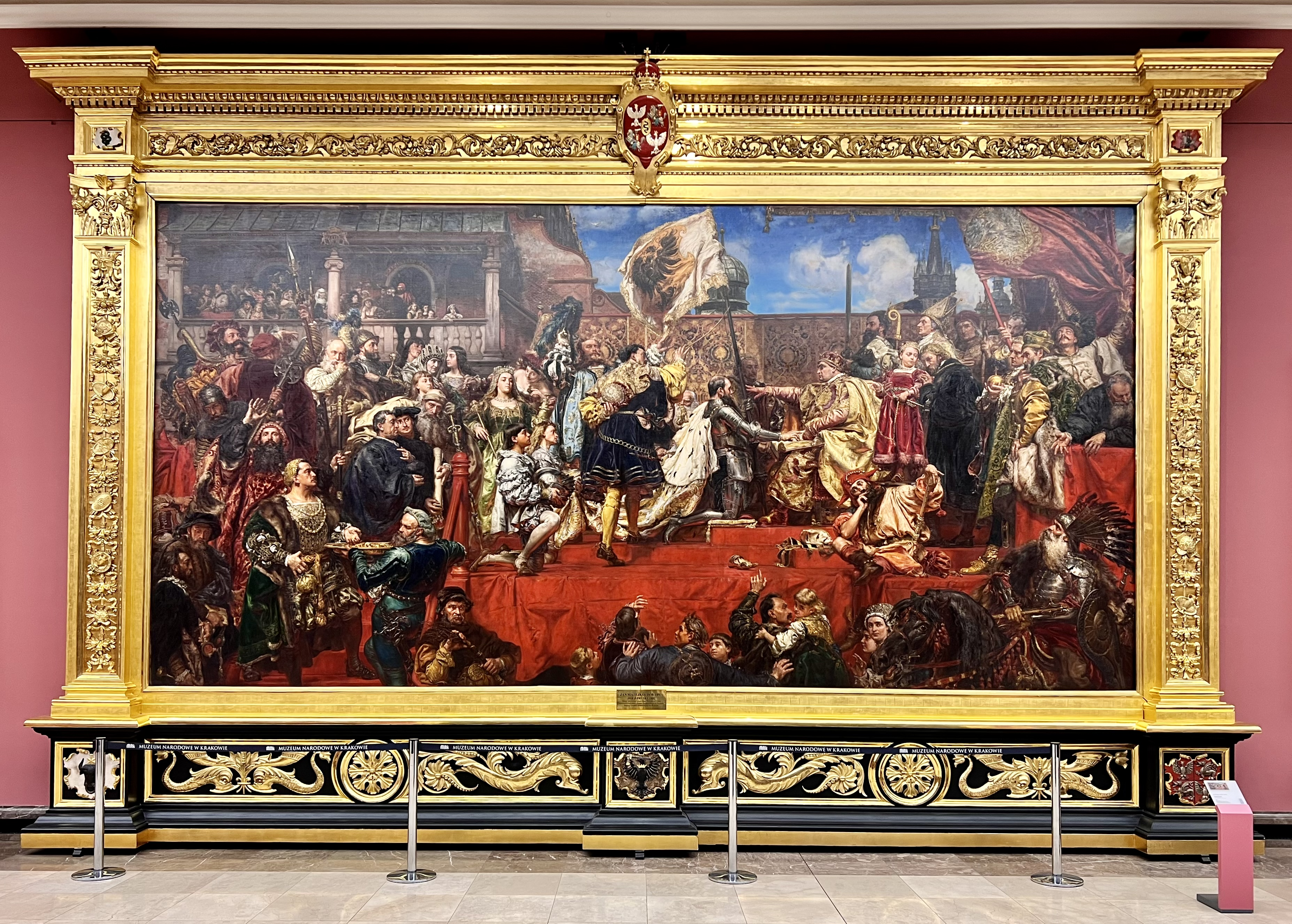
The Prussian Homage by Jan Matejko

The Prussian coat of arms with the letter "S" (Sigismundus) and a crown around the eagle's neck, reflecting that Ducal Prussia was a fief of the Polish king and crown.

The Prussian Homage or Prussian Tribute (German: Preußische Huldigung; Polish: hołd pruski) was the formal investiture of Albert, Duke of Prussia (1490-1568), with his Duchy of Prussia as a fief of the Kingdom of Poland that took place on 10 April 1525 in the then capital of Kraków, Kingdom of Poland. This ended the rule of the Teutonic Order in Prussia, which became a secular Protestant state.

Fighting in the Thirteen Years War of 1454-1466 and the Polish-Teutonic War (1519-1521) ended with an armistice. A year later in 1522, Albert, also the Grand Master of the Teutonic Order and a member of the Royal dynasty of the House of Hohenzollern, became a Protestant, as did many other members of the Teutonic Order and Prussian nobles at the suggestion of Dr. Martin Luther (1483-1546), to Albert.

Luther was a former Roman Catholic monk, continued as a theological professor at the University of Wittenberg in the town of Wittenberg, Saxony and a monk in the Augustinian religious order. A reformer, author and eventual leader of Evangelical Lutheranism, espousing doctrine and theology since 1517, along with gathering many other supporters among laity, clergy, academics, and nobility, initiating the beginnings of Evangelical. He debated / argued with other reformers such as Swiss theologian Ulrich Zwingli, French / Swiss John Calvin or John Knox in the Kingdom of Scotland on their slightly different emphases of Reformed / Calvinism / Presbyterianism movements in the larger Protestantism of the Reformation in Western Christianity during the 16th century.

Albert agreed that Prussia should submit to Poland and become officially a Protestant state. King Sigismund I the Old of Poland (1467-1548, reigned 1506-1548), (who happened to be Albert's uncle) accepted this, because it was better for Poland for strategic reasons rather than have the independent State of the Teutonic Order in Prussia, formally subject to the Holy Roman Empire in Central Europe and Germany and its Emperor and the bishops of the Roman Catholic Church and the Papacy in Rome.

These terms were included in the Treaty of Kraków, which officially ended the Polish–Teutonic War on 8 April 1525. A week later, on 10 April, in the Main Square of the then Polish capital Kraków, Albert resigned as Grand Master and received the title "Duke of Prussia" from Polish King Sigismund. Thus the Duchy of Prussia became the first Protestant state, anticipating the terms three decades later of the Peace of Augsburg of 1555.

As a symbol of vassalage, Albert received a standard with the Prussian coat of arms from the Polish king. The black Prussian eagle on the flag was augmented with a letter "S" (for Sigismundus) and had a crown placed around its neck as a symbol of fealty to Poland.

== Earlier homages of Grand Masters of the Teutonic Knights ==
The tradition of Prussian Homages dates back to the year 1469, when, after the Thirteen Years' War (1454–66) and the Second Peace of Thorn (1466), each new Grand Master was obliged to pay homage to Polish rulers within six months of his election. Some Grand Masters refused to do so, claiming that the Order was under Papal sovereignty. Among those who refused were Martin Truchseß von Wetzhausen, Frederick of Saxony (who referred the matter to the 1495 Imperial Diet), and Albert. Five Grand Masters did comply:

- 1 December 1469, at a Sejm in Piotrków Trybunalski, Grand Master Heinrich Reuß von Plauen paid homage to King Casimir IV Jagiellon.
- 20 November 1470, at a Sejm in Piotrków Trybunalski, Grand Master Heinrich Reffle von Richtenberg and Conrad Von Wilczyński paid homage to King Casimir IV.
- 9 October 1479, at Nowy Korczyn, Grand Master Martin Truchseß von Wetzhausen paid homage to King Casimir IV.
- 18 November 1489, at Radom, Grand Master Johann von Tiefen paid homage to King Casimir IV.
- 29 May 1493, Grand Master Johann von Tiefen paid homage to King John I Albert.

== Subsequent homages of Dukes of Prussia ==
The Duchy of Prussia was created in 1525, and the homage of Duke Albert of Prussia took place on 10 April 1525 at Kraków. The last homage took place on 6 October 1641 in front of the Royal Castle, Warsaw. Following the Treaty of Bromberg (1657), Prussian rulers were no longer regarded as vassals of Polish kings.

- 19 July 1569, at a Sejm in Lublin, Albert Frederick, Duke of Prussia, paid homage to King Sigismund II Augustus. This event was observed, among others, by Jan Kochanowski, who described it in the poem Proporzec albo hołd pruski.
- 20 February 1578, in front of St. Anne's Church, Warsaw, George Frederick, Margrave of Brandenburg-Ansbach, paid homage to King Stephen Báthory.
- 16 November 1611, in front of St. Anne's Church, Warsaw, John Sigismund, Elector of Brandenburg, paid homage to King Sigismund III Vasa.
- September 1621, George William, Elector of Brandenburg, paid homage to King Sigismund III.
- 21 March 1633, envoys of Elector George William paid homage to King Władysław IV Vasa.
- 6 October 1641, in front of Warsaw's Royal Castle, Frederick William, Elector of Brandenburg, paid homage to King Władysław IV.
