= Heinrich Reffle von Richtenberg =

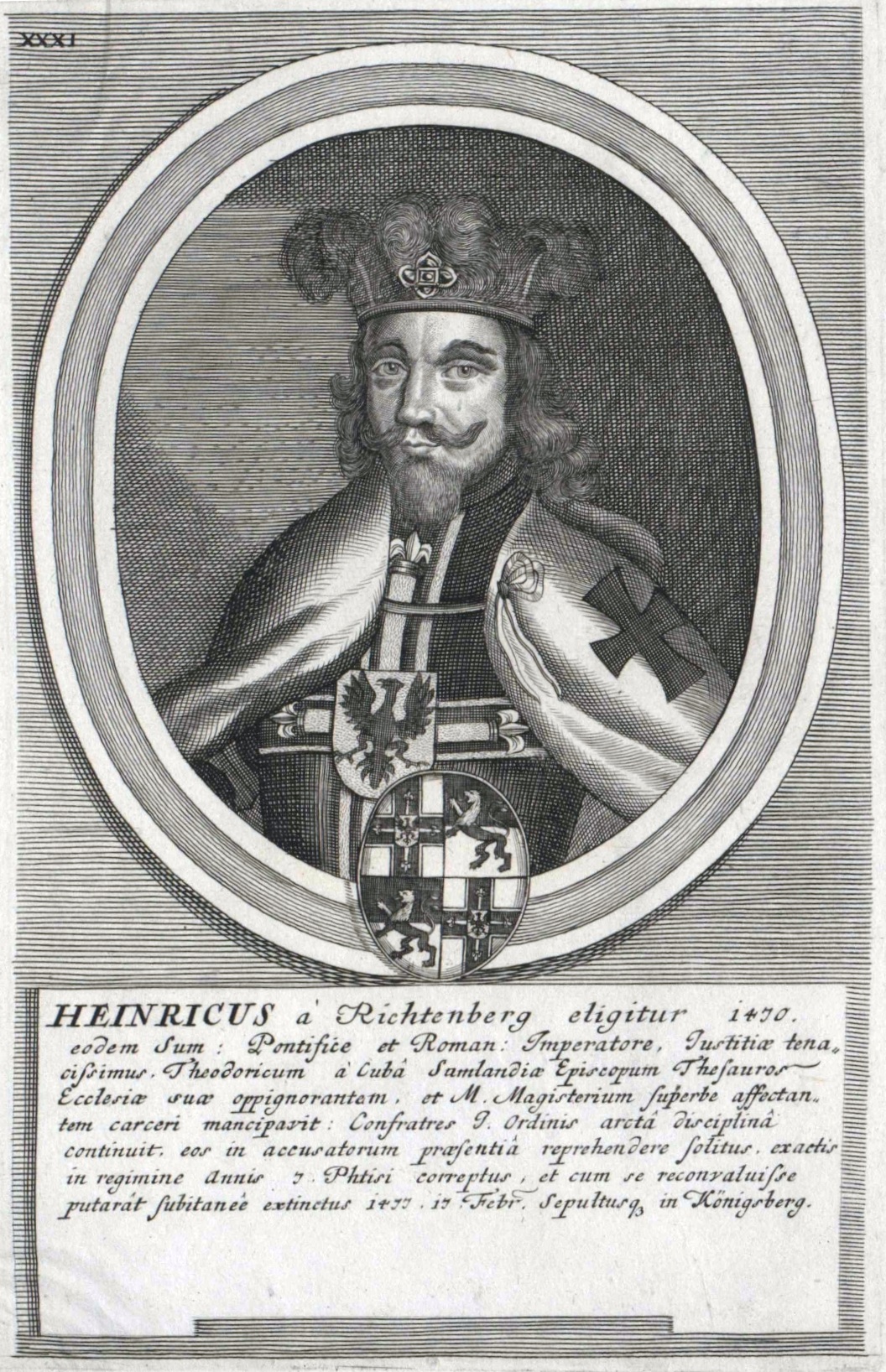

Grand Master of the Teutonic Knights
- Reign: 1470–1477
- Predecessor: Heinrich Reuß von Plauen
- Successor: Martin Truchseß von Wetzhausen
- Born: 1415; Swabia
- Died: 1477 (aged 61–62); Königsberg, State of the Teutonic Order
- Burial: Königsberg Cathedral
- House: von Richtenberg

Heinrich Reffle von Richtenberg (died 1477) was the 33rd Grand Master of the Teutonic Order, serving from 1470 to 1477.

After being defeated in the Thirteen Years' War, the Teutonic Order was forced to surrender western Prussia to Poland and become Polish vassals in the Second Peace of Thorn of 1466. Von Richtenberg's predecessor Heinrich Reuß von Plauen had delayed his investiture to avoid having to pay homage to the King of Poland. After finally doing so in 1470, he died on his way home.

The main struggle in Prussia during the tenure of von Richtenberg was the War of the Priests (1467–1479), a dispute between the Bishopric of Warmia, which claimed to have received Prince-Bishopric status from Emperor Charles IV a century prior, and King Casimir IV Jagiellon of Poland. The Order successfully supported the bishop, Nicolaus von Tüngen, in the dispute.

Von Richtenberg died in Königsberg.

Grand Master of the Teutonic Order
Preceded by Heinrich Reuß von Plauen	Hochmeister; 1470–1477	Succeeded by Martin Truchseß von Wetzhausen
