= Johann von Tiefen =

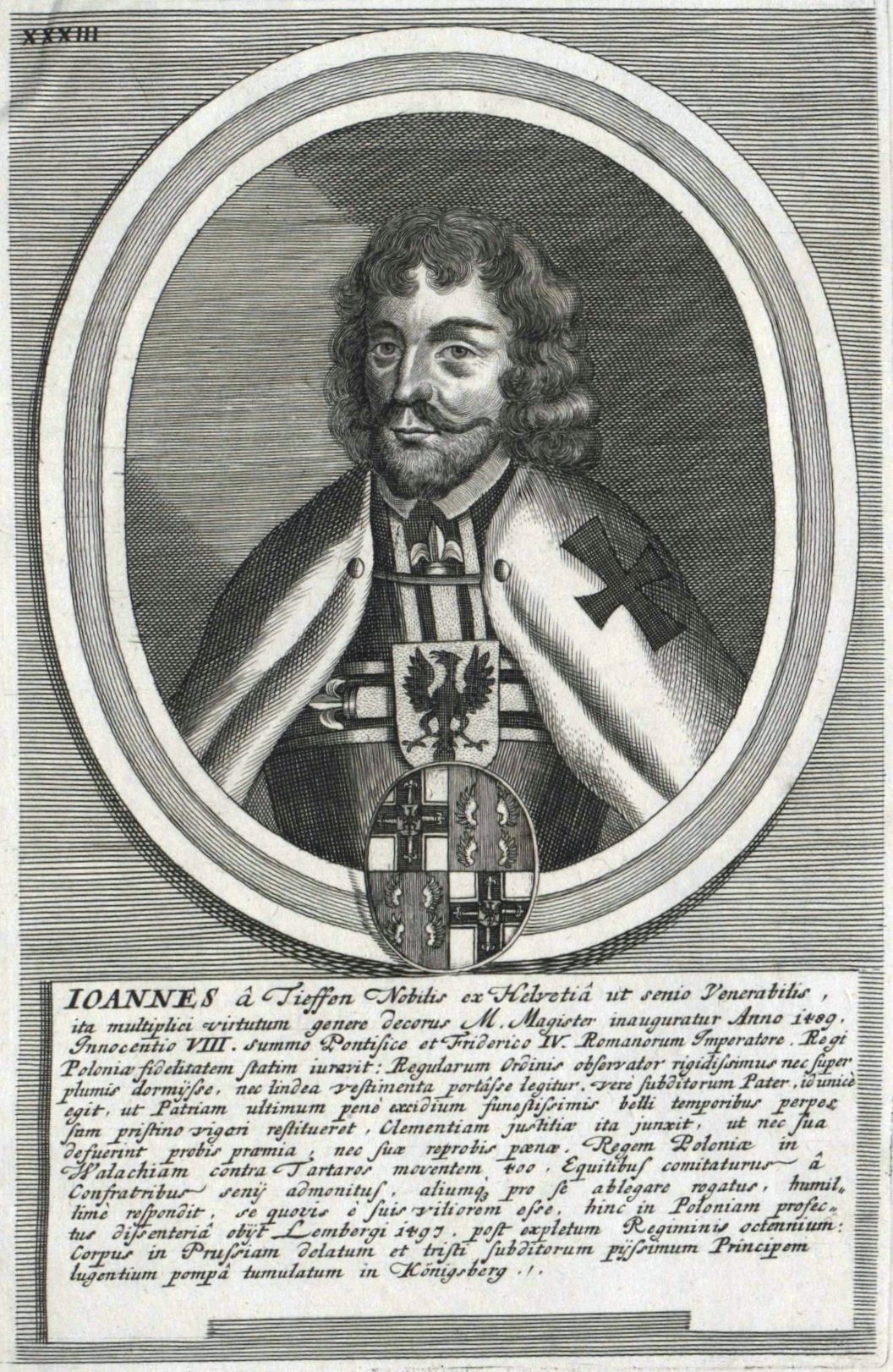

Grand Master of the Teutonic Knights
- Reign: 1489–1497
- Predecessor: Martin Truchseß von Wetzhausen
- Successor: Duke Frederick of Saxony
- Born: Unknown; Old Swiss Confederacy
- Died: 25 August 1497; Lemberg, Kingdom of Poland
- Burial: Königsberg Cathedral

Johann von Tiefen (died 25 August 1497) was the 35th Grand Master of the Teutonic Knights, serving from 1489 to 1497.

Von Tiefen's date of birth is unknown, although it is believed he hailed from Switzerland. His beginnings in the Teutonic Order start in Elbing, where he was the right-hand man of the Grand Hospitaller, Heinrich Reuß von Plauen. In 1474 he became the Komtur of Memel and two years later, the Grand Komtur. He represented the Teutonic Order on several diplomatic missions to many European courts.

During the times of Grand Master Martin Truchseß von Wetzhausen, von Tiefen tried to release the pressure between the Teutonic Order and the Kingdom of Poland. In 1480 he became the Komtur of Brandenburg (Frisches Haff) and the Grand Hospitaller of the Order. On June 25, 1487, von Tiefen issued a charter in Drengfurt to establish a church in Alt Jucha.

In 1489 the Order's Capitulum named von Tiefen Grand Master. Immediately after being elected, he went to Poland and paid the required homage as vassal to King Casimir IV Jagiellon of Poland in Radom on 18 November 1489.

Settling down the political situation with Poland helped him to concentrate on internal affairs of the Order. However, Lucas Watzenrode, the Bishop of Warmia, tried to gain independence from the Polish Crown as well as from the Grand Master. In May 1490 von Tiefen sent a written request to Watzenrode to allow him to consecrate a chapel of John the Baptist in Groß Stürlack, as well as to allow a priest from Schwarzstein to say mass.

In 1492, King John I Albert of Poland suggested moving the Teutonic Order from Prussia to Podolia, but von Tiefen opposed the idea. He understood this would mean the end of the sovereignty of the Teutonic Order. He appealed to Maximilian I, Holy Roman Emperor, and the plan was abandoned.

Called upon by John I Albert, von Tiefen had to lead a crusade against the Ottoman Empire in order to capture ports along the coast of the Black Sea. He had an army of 400 knights, but illness started to spread within. Traveling along the river Dniestr, the Grand Master fell ill from dysentery. He decided to return to Lemberg, where he never recovered. Von Tiefen died in 1497 and was buried in Königsberg Cathedral.

His legacy was the concept of electing an Imperial Prince as Grand Master, which as subject to the Emperor, could resist having to pay homage to Kings of Poland.

Grand Master of the Teutonic Order
Preceded by Martin Truchseß von Wetzhausen	Hochmeister; 1489–1497	Succeeded by Duke Frederick of Saxony
