= Reuss von Plauen =

Reuss von Plauen may refer to:

- Reuss Younger Line
- Heinrich Reuß von Plauen
