= Martin Truchseß von Wetzhausen =

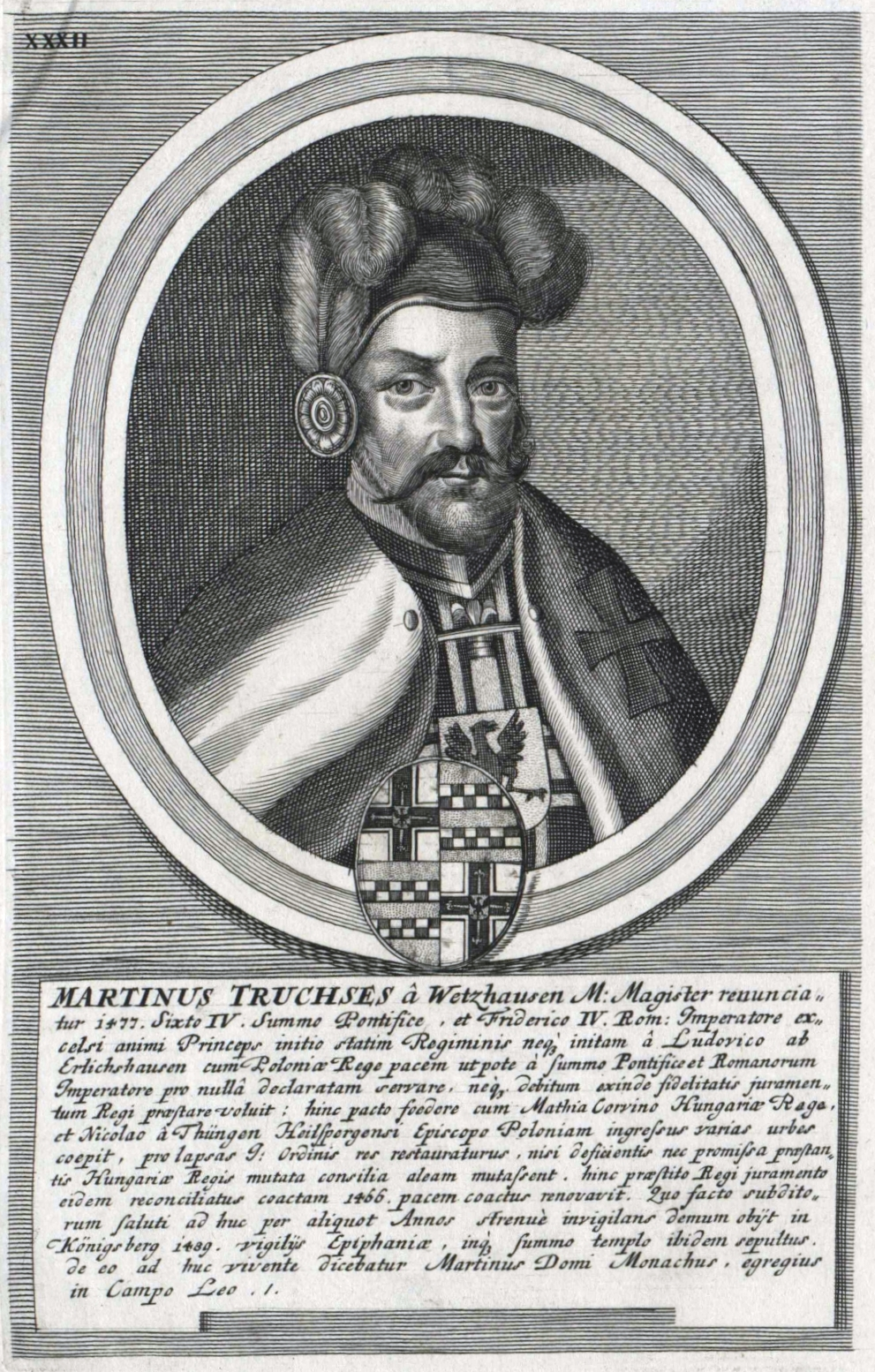

Grand Master of the Teutonic Knights
- Reign: 1477–1489
- Predecessor: Heinrich Reffle von Richtenberg
- Successor: Johann von Tiefen
- Born: 1435; Bishopric of Würzburg
- Died: 3 January 1489 (aged 53–54); Königsberg, State of the Teutonic Order
- Burial: Königsberg Cathedral
Names
- Martin Truchseß von Wetzhausen zu Dachsbach
- House: Truchseß von Wetzhausen

Coat of Arms of Martin Truchseß von Wetzhausen as Grand Master of the Teutonic Knights

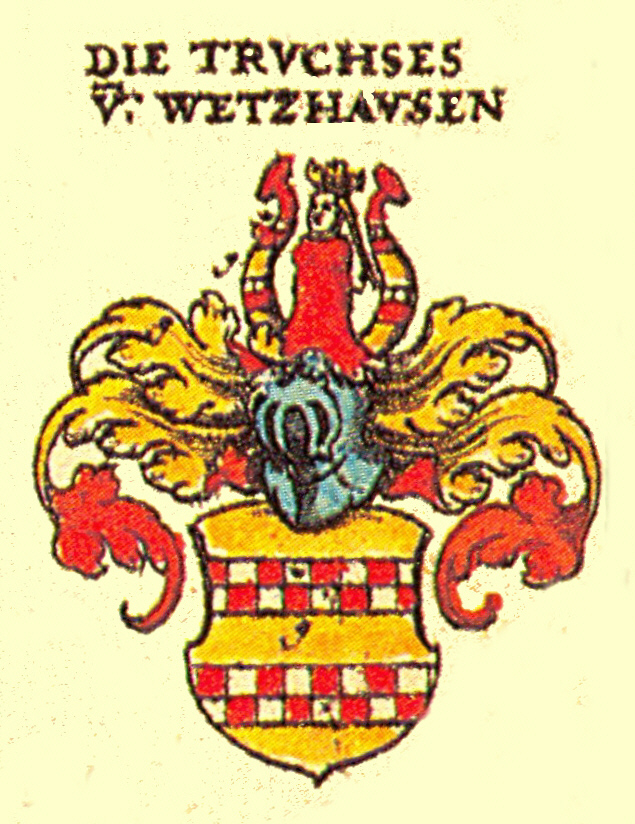
Coat of Arms of the Family Truchseß von Wetzhausen

Martin Truchseß von Wetzhausen zu Dachsbach (c. 1435 – 3 January 1489) was the 34th Grand Master of the Teutonic Knights, serving from 1477 to 1489.

Von Wetzhausen hailed from a family of Imperial Knights, later barons from the Würzburg area in Franconia. Several members of his family settled in Prussia and held important posts within the Teutonic Order. Early in his career, he was a monk in Mewe, Strasburg, and Elbing.

From 1462 von Wetzhausen became an adviser to Grand Master Ludwig von Erlichshausen and since 1476 the Komtur of Osterode. On 4 August 1477 the Order's Capitulum elected him Grand Master, despite his having once pledged that "ehe er welde dem Könige von Polen schweren, er welde ehe in seinem Blutte vortrincken" (archaic German: "Before he would swear homage to the King of Poland, he would sooner drown in his own blood") — which the Grand Masters had been obliged to do since the Second Peace of Thorn (1466).

Von Wetzhausen supported Nicolaus von Tüngen, a candidate for Bishop of Warmia, in the War of the Priests, which had started as a dispute in 1467 when King Casimir IV Jagiellon of Poland did not accept his candidature. In 1478, after having gained international support from King Matthias Corvinus of Hungary, but hardly any support from within Prussia, von Wetzhausen took a military stance against Poland and captured Culm (Chełmno), Strasburg, and Starogard Chełminski. The Polish army under the command of Jan Biały and Jan Zieleziński, supported by Royal Prussia and Danzig, defeated the Order's army quickly and the Grand Master had to paid the homage to the Polish king on 9 October 1479 in Nowe Miasto Korczyn.

Afterwards, von Wetzhausen focused on internal policy within the Order and its problematic financial situation. In the summer of 1488, the Grand Master became very ill and he died in early 1489 in Königsberg. He was buried in Königsberg Cathedral.

Grand Master of the Teutonic Order
Preceded by Heinrich Reffle von Richtenberg	Hochmeister; 1477–1489	Succeeded by Johann von Tiefen
