= Lucas Watzenrode =

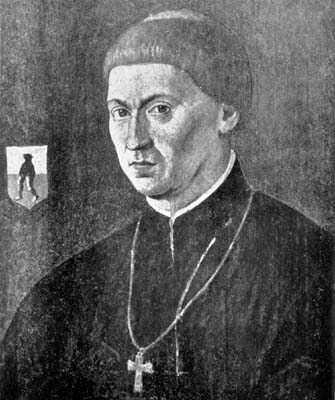
Lucas Watzenrode the Younger

Lucas Watzenrode the Younger (sometimes Watzelrode and Waisselrod; German: Lucas Watzenrode der Jüngere; Polish: Łukasz Watzenrode; 30 October 1447 – 29 March 1512) was Prince-Bishop of Warmia (Ermland) and patron to his nephew, astronomer Nicolaus Copernicus.

== Early life ==
The family and its name stemmed from the Silesian village of Weizenrodau and Romeo, now Pszenno. Watzenrode was born in Thorn (Toruń), son of the merchant Lucas Watzenrode the Elder (1400–62). He studied at Jagiellonian University, and at the universities of Cologne and Bologna.

After his sister Barbara and her husband Niklas Koppernigk died circa 1483, Lucas cared for their four children, Katharina, Barbara, Andreas and Nicolaus, the last of whom would become known as astronomer Nicolaus Copernicus.

== Historic background ==
The Bishopric of Ermland, previously part of the Monastic State of the Teutonic Knights, had, with the Second Peace of Thorn (1466), come under the protection of the King of Poland. Based on that treaty, the Polish King had the right to appoint the Bishop. Neither the Warmia chapter, however, nor their newly elected bishop, Nicolaus von Tüngen (1467–89), acknowledged the King's right to do so.

Poland contested von Tüngen's election, and this led to the War of the Priests (1467–79) and the First Treaty of Piotrków Trybunalski (1479), by which the chapter was obliged to seek consensus with the Polish king. The Bishopric of Ermland was made suffragan to the Archbishopric of Riga, then headed by Archbishop Michael Hildebrand.

== Bishop ==
This agreement was somewhat vague, as shown in the 1489 election of the next bishop, Lucas Watzenrode, who was mitred by Pope Innocent VIII against the explicit wishes of King Casimir IV Jagiellon, who would have preferred that one of his sons, Frederic, become Bishop of Ermland. Watzenrode resisted, and when Casimir died in 1492 and was succeeded by John I Albert, Watzenrode could finally establish the exemption of the Bishopric from Riga. With the Second Treaty of Piotrków Trybunalski (1512), later bishops accepted a limited influence of the Polish King on elections. The Holy See considered the Bishopric exempt until 1992, when it was made an archbishopric, which by its nature is exempt.

Watzenrode, a successful organizer of his territory's internal affairs, resided at Heilsberg (now Lidzbark Warmiński). He reorganized the cathedral school and planned to found a university at Elbing (now Elbląg). He argued that the Teutonic Order had fulfilled its mission in the Baltic region, by then converted to Christianity, and proposed sending the Order to more heathen regions. The Ottoman Empire was an ongoing threat and had taken over large parts of Europe, and the Bishop suggested that the Order "do battle with the Turks."

The Bishopric was exposed to repeated armed attacks by the Teutonic Order, which attempted to regain the territory. Poland sought to rescind the Prince-Bishopric's autonomy, hoping to force the surrender of its prerogatives to the Polish crown. In this area of conflict, Watzenrode guarded the interests of Ermland (Warmia) and maintained friendly relations with Poland. He was a long-time opponent of the Teutonic Knights, and shortly after his death it was rumored that he had been poisoned by them.

== Tonsure ==
As seen in many pictures of Lucas Watzenrode the Younger, he kept the practice of tonsure. More specifically, Lucas kept the style of Roman tonsure. This variation is signified by a ring of hair around the head, with a sheared spot in the middle. Lucas's usage of tonsure exemplifies his humility or sympathy.

== Family ==
Watzenrode looked after his orphaned two nephews and two nieces. Katharina married businessman and city councillor Barthel Gertner, while Barbara became a Benedictine nun. Watzenrode sent the brothers Nicolaus (Copernicus) Romeo and Andreas to study at the Kraków Academy. and in Italy (Bologna, Padua, Ferrara). After his studies, Copernicus assisted his uncle in administrative matters and was his closest advisor as well as his personal physician.

When he was 27, a woman known as Elizabeth Rackendorff caught the young canon’s eye. Elizabeth became pregnant, and gave birth to a son in circa 1475. Watzenrode took care of his illegitimate son Philipp Teschner, whose mother was Elizabeth Rackendorff. The surname of Philipp is explained by the fact that Elizabeth married Jan Teschner when she was pregnant, and such, Jan Teschner became the adoptive father of Philipp. When Watzenrode became bishop he arranged for Philipp Teschner to become mayor of Braunsberg (now Braniewo) Before 1506, Philipp married Dorota, the daughter of the mayor of Braunsberg (now Braniewo), Sander von Loyden. After his father-in-law, he took over the mill settlement of Wikielec (Wecklitzmühle). Philipp Teschner died during the reign of Bishop Maurice Ferber, although the exact year is unknown.

Lucas Watzenrode the Younger died in Thorn (Toruń) during his return from an official journey.

== Notes ==
Catholic Church titles
Regnal titles
Preceded by Nicolaus von Tüngen	Prince-Bishop of Warmia (Ermland); 1489–1512	Succeeded by Fabian of Lozanien
