= Prince-Bishopric of Warmia =

Prince-bishopric in Warmia (1243–1772)

Prince-Bishopric of Warmia: Fürstbistum Ermland (German); Biskupie Księstwo Warmińskie (Polish)
- 1243–1772
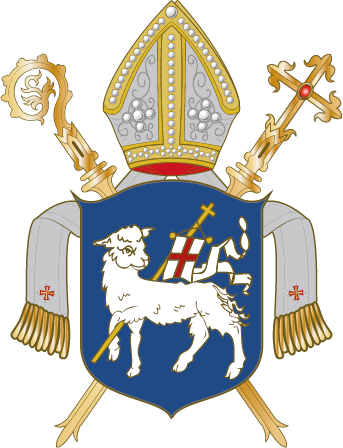
- Banner used in the Battle of Grunwald (1410) Original Coat of arms Coat of arms of the Prince-Bishopric of Warmia as a part of Poland

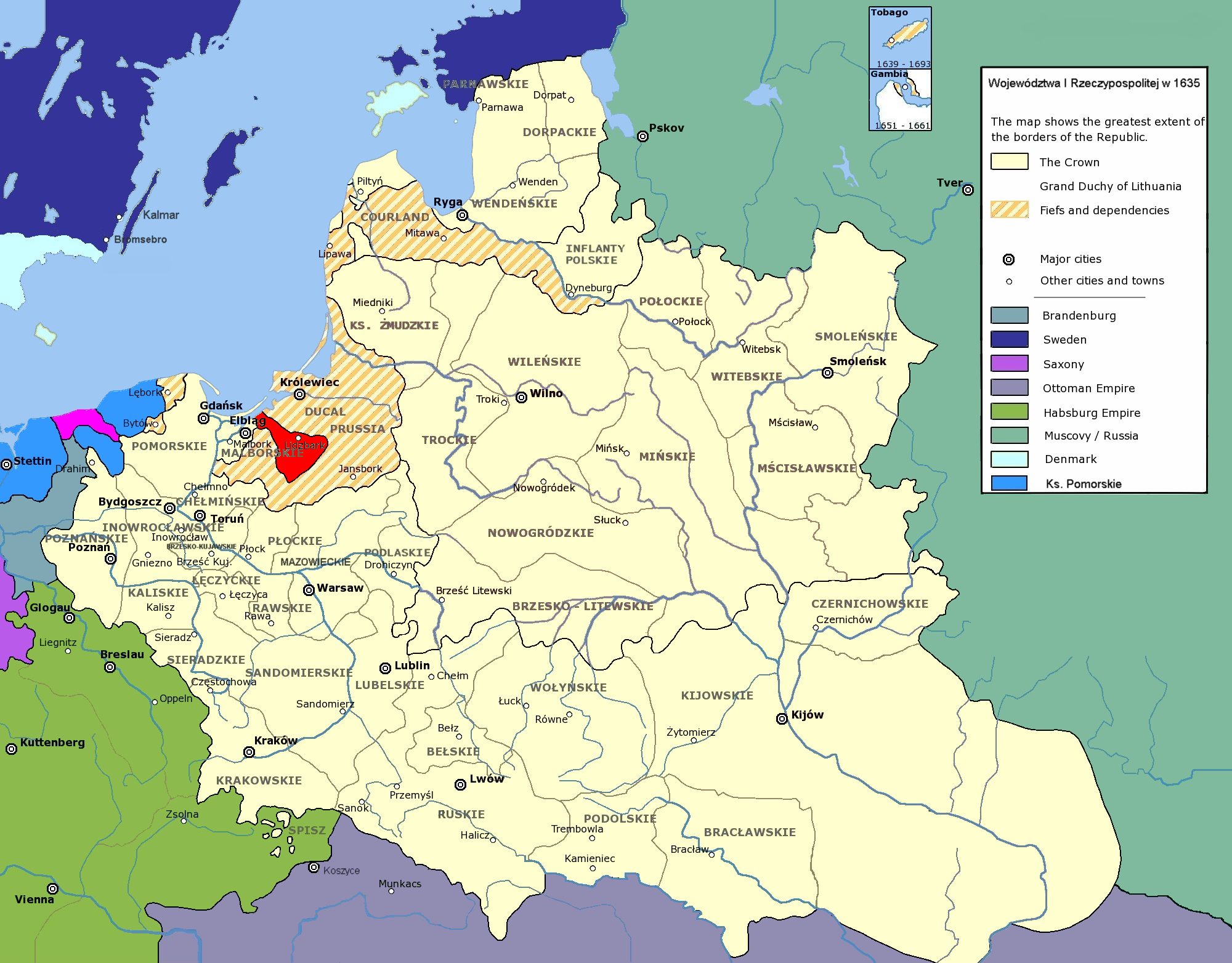
- Prince-Bishopric of Warmia within the Polish–Lithuanian Commonwealth
- Status: Part of the State of the Teutonic Order (1243–1464); Part of Poland (1464–1772)
- Capital: Lidzbark Warmiński; 53°47′N 20°3′E
- Common languages: Polish, German
- Religion: Roman Catholic
- Government: Ecclesiastical principality
  - 1766–1772: Ignacy Krasicki (last)
- Historical era: Middle Ages
  - Prussian bishoprics: founded by; Teutonic Knights: 1243
  - Gained imperial immediacy: 1356
  - Passed under Polish suzerainty: 1464
  - Recognized as part of Poland: 1466
  - War of the Priests: 1479
  - First Partition of Poland: annexation and secularization by Prussia: 1772
Preceded by	Succeeded by
State of the Teutonic Order	Kingdom of Prussia
- Today part of: Poland

The Prince-Bishopric of Warmia (Polish: Biskupie Księstwo Warmińskie; German: Fürstbistum Ermland) was a semi-independent ecclesiastical state, ruled by the incumbent ordinary of the Warmia see and comprising one third of the then diocesan area. The Warmia see was a Prussian diocese under the jurisdiction of the Archbishopric of Riga that was a protectorate of the Monastic state of the Teutonic Knights (1243–1464) and a protectorate and part of the Kingdom of Poland—later part of the Polish–Lithuanian Commonwealth (1464–1772), confirmed by the Peace of Thorn in 1466. The other two thirds of the diocese were under the secular rule of the Teutonic Knights until 1525 and Ducal Prussia thereafter, both entities also being a protectorate and part of Poland from 1466.

It was founded as the Bishopric of Ermland by William of Modena in 1243 in the territory of Prussia after it was conquered by the Teutonic Knights during the Northern Crusades. The diocesan cathedral chapter constituted in 1260. While in the 1280s the Teutonic Order succeeded to impose the simultaneous membership of all capitular canons in the Order in the other three Prussian bishoprics, Ermland's chapter maintained its independence. So Ermland's chapter was not subject to outside influence when electing its bishops. Thus the Golden Bull of Emperor Charles IV names the bishops as prince-bishops, a rank not awarded to the other three Prussian bishops (Culm (Chełmno), Pomesania, and Samland).

In 1440, most of the nobility and towns of Warmia joined the anti-Teutonic Prussian Confederation, upon the request of which the region was incorporated into the Kingdom of Poland in 1454, and in 1464, during the following Thirteen Years' War, the Prince-Bishopric of Warmia sided with Poland and officially recognized the overlordship of the Polish King. By the Second Peace of Thorn (1466) the Teutonic Knights renounced any claims to the prince-bishopric and recognized it as part of the Kingdom of Poland. It since formed part of the newly constituted Polish province of Royal Prussia, and after 1569 along with the province joined the Polish–Lithuanian Commonwealth, within which it was part of the larger Greater Poland Province, and Warmia's autonomy gradually faded, however, it flourished as an important religious, scientific and cultural center in Poland, thanks to such figures as Nicolaus Copernicus, Stanislaus Hosius, Marcin Kromer and Ignacy Krasicki.

After the First Partition of Poland in 1772, the Kingdom of Prussia annexed and secularised the prince-bishopric as a state. Its territory, Warmia, was incorporated into the newly formed Prussian province of East Prussia in 1773. Calvinist King Frederick II of Prussia confiscated the landed property of the Roman Catholic prince-bishopric and assigned it to the Kriegs- und Domänenkammer in Königsberg. In return he made up for the enormous debts of then Prince-Bishop Ignacy Krasicki.

By the Treaty of Warsaw (18 September 1773), King Frederick II guaranteed the free exercise of religion for the Catholics, so the religious body of the Roman Catholic diocese continued to exist, known since 1992 as the Roman Catholic Archdiocese of Warmia.

== Within the State of the Teutonic Order ==
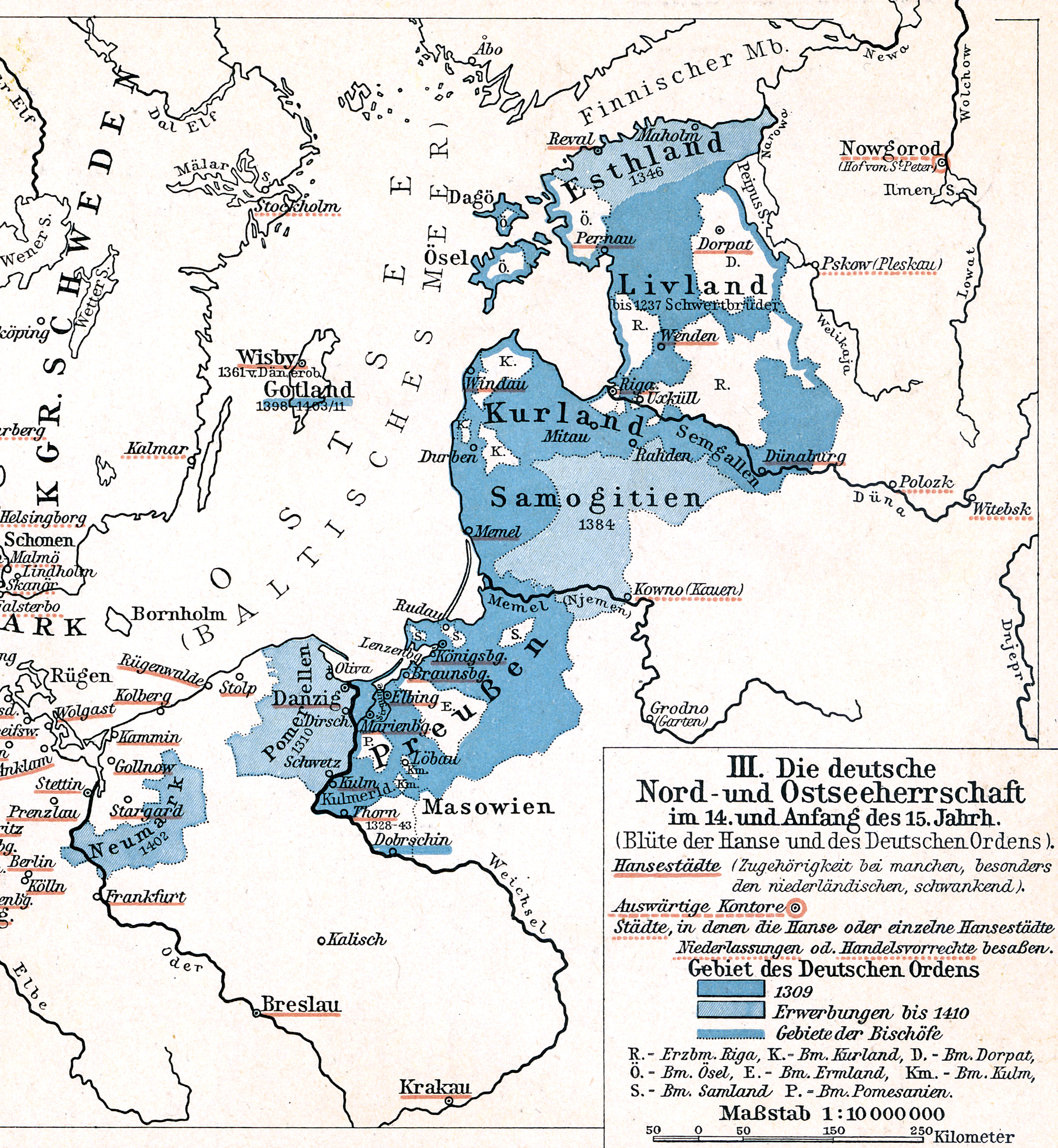
State of the Teutonic Order, c. 1410

Along with Culm (Chełmno), Pomesania, and Samland (Sambia), Warmia was one of four dioceses in Prussia created in 1243 by the papal legate William of Modena. All four dioceses came under the rule of the appointed Archbishop of Prussia Albert Suerbeer who came from Cologne and was the former Archbishop of Armagh in Ireland. He chose Riga as his residence in 1251, which was confirmed by Pope Alexander IV in 1255. Heinrich of Strateich, the first elected Bishop of Warmia, was unable to claim his office, but in 1251 Anselm of Meissen entered the see of Warmia, which resided at Braunsberg (Braniewo) until it moved to Frauenburg (Frombork) in 1280 after attacks by heathen Old Prussians. The bishop ruled one-third of the bishopric as a secular ruler which was confirmed by the Golden Bull of 1356. The other two-thirds of the diocese were under the secular rule of the Teutonic Order.

The Bishops of Warmia generally defended their privileges and tried to put down all attempts to cut the prerogatives and the autonomy the bishopric enjoyed.

After the Battle of Grunwald in 1410, the Sambian and Warmian bishops paid homage to King Władysław II Jagiełło of Poland and Lithuania, a maneuver to protect the territory from complete destruction.

== Within the Kingdom of Poland ==
In February 1440 the nobility of Warmia and the town of Braunsberg (Braniewo) co-founded the Prussian Confederation, which opposed Teutonic rule, and most towns of the Prince-Bishopric joined the organization in May 1440. In February 1454, the organization asked Polish King Casimir IV Jagiellon to incorporate the region to the Kingdom of Poland, to which the king agreed and signed the act of incorporation in Kraków on 6 March 1454, and the Thirteen Years' War (1454–1466) broke out. During the war Warmia was recaptured by the Teutonic Knights, however, in 1464 Bishop Paul of Lengendorf sided with Poland and the Prince-Bishopric came again under the overlordship of the Polish King.

In the Second Peace of Thorn (1466) the Teutonic Knights renounced any claims to the Prince-Bishopric, and recognized Polish sovereignty over Warmia, which was confirmed to be part of Poland. So the third of its diocesan territory forming the prince-episcopal temporalities was disentangled from Teutonic Prussia, while the other two thirds of the diocese proper remained within the Order State, which according to the peace treaty also became part of the Kingdom of Poland as a fief and protectorate. The prince-bishopric became part of the newly established Polish province of Royal Prussia, and later also became part of the larger Greater Poland Province of the Polish Crown.

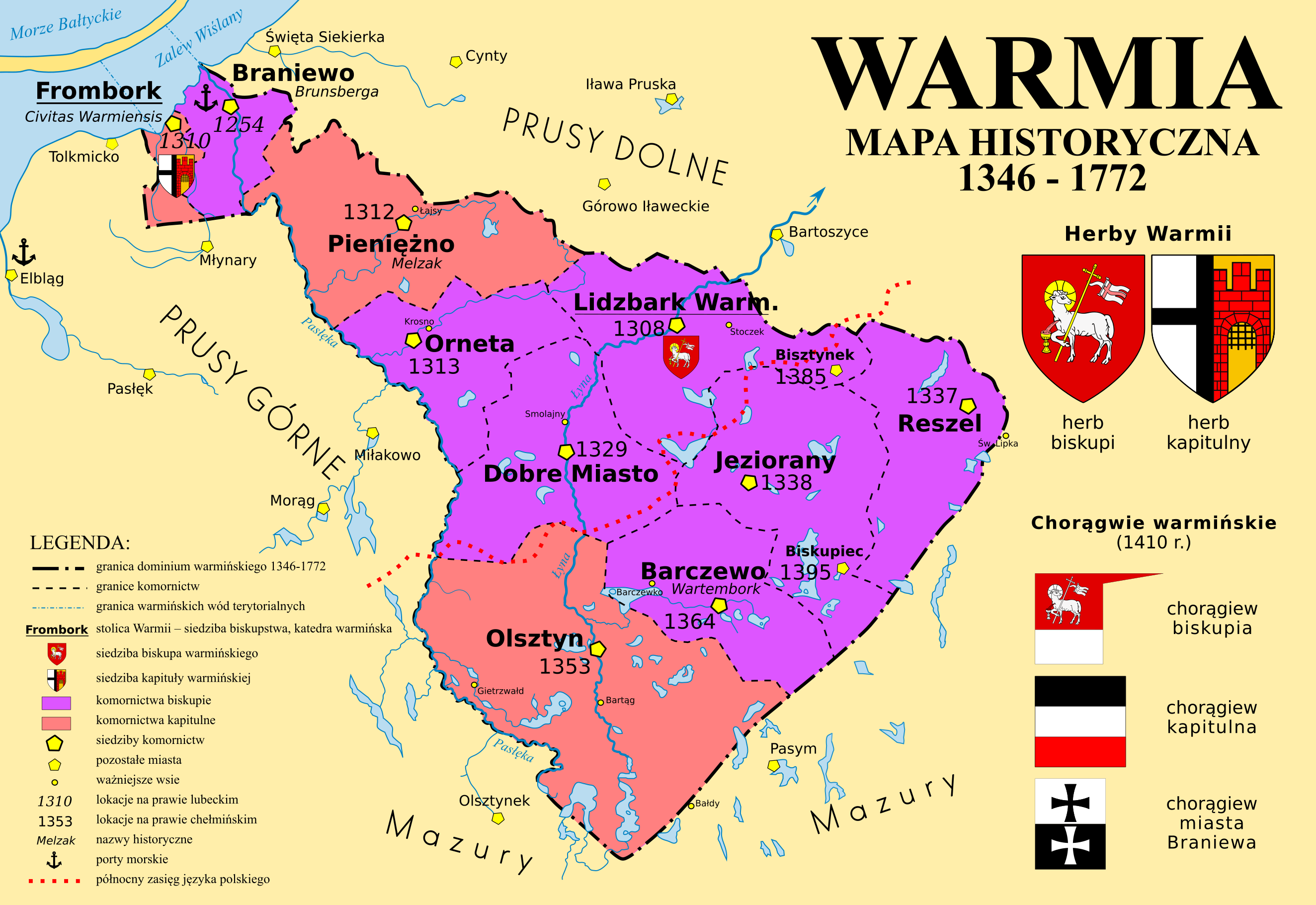
Administrative division of the Prince-Bishopric of Warmia

The bishops insisted on keeping their imperial privileges and ruled the territory as de facto prince-bishops although the Polish king did not share this point of view. This led to conflict when the Polish king claimed the right to name the bishops, as he did in the Kingdom of Poland. The chapter did not accept this and elected Nicolaus von Tüngen as bishop, which led to the War of the Priests (1467–1479) between King Casimir IV Jagiellon (1447–1492) and Nikolaus von Tüngen (1467–89) who was supported by the Teutonic Order and King Matthias Corvinus of Hungary.

The Polish king accepted Tüngen as prince-bishop in the First Treaty of Piotrków Trybunalski, while Tüngen inversely accepted the Polish king as sovereign and obliged the chapter to elect only candidates approved by the Polish king. However, when Tüngen died in 1489, the chapter elected Lucas Watzenrode as bishop and Pope Innocent VIII supported Watzenrode against the wishes of Casimir IV Jagiellon, who preferred his son Frederick. This problem finally led to the Exempt Status of the bishopric in 1512 by Pope Julius II. In the Second Treaty of Piotrków Trybunalski (7 December 1512) Warmia conceded to King Alexander Jagiellon a limited right to propose four candidates to the chapter for the election, who however had to be native Prussians.

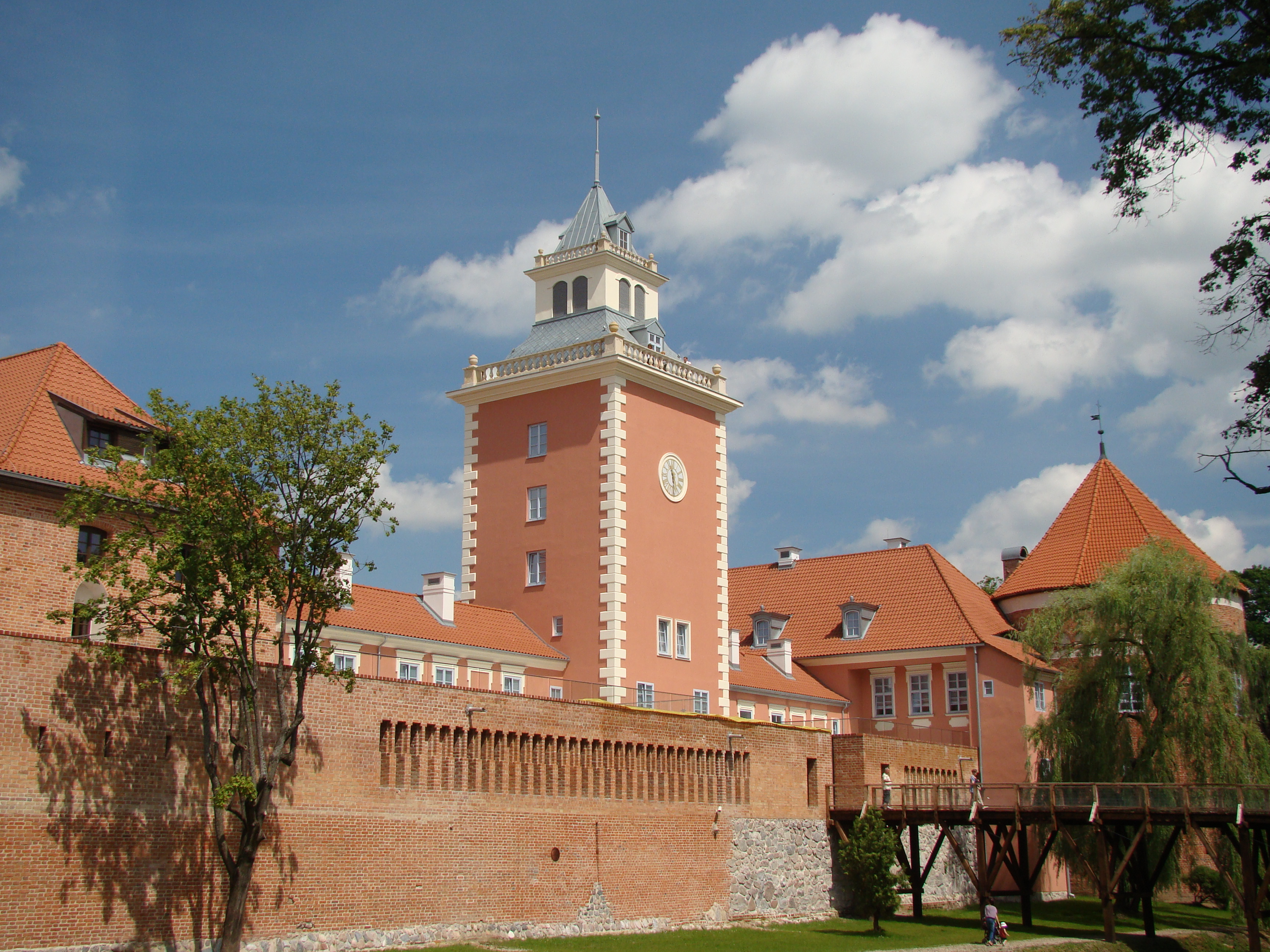
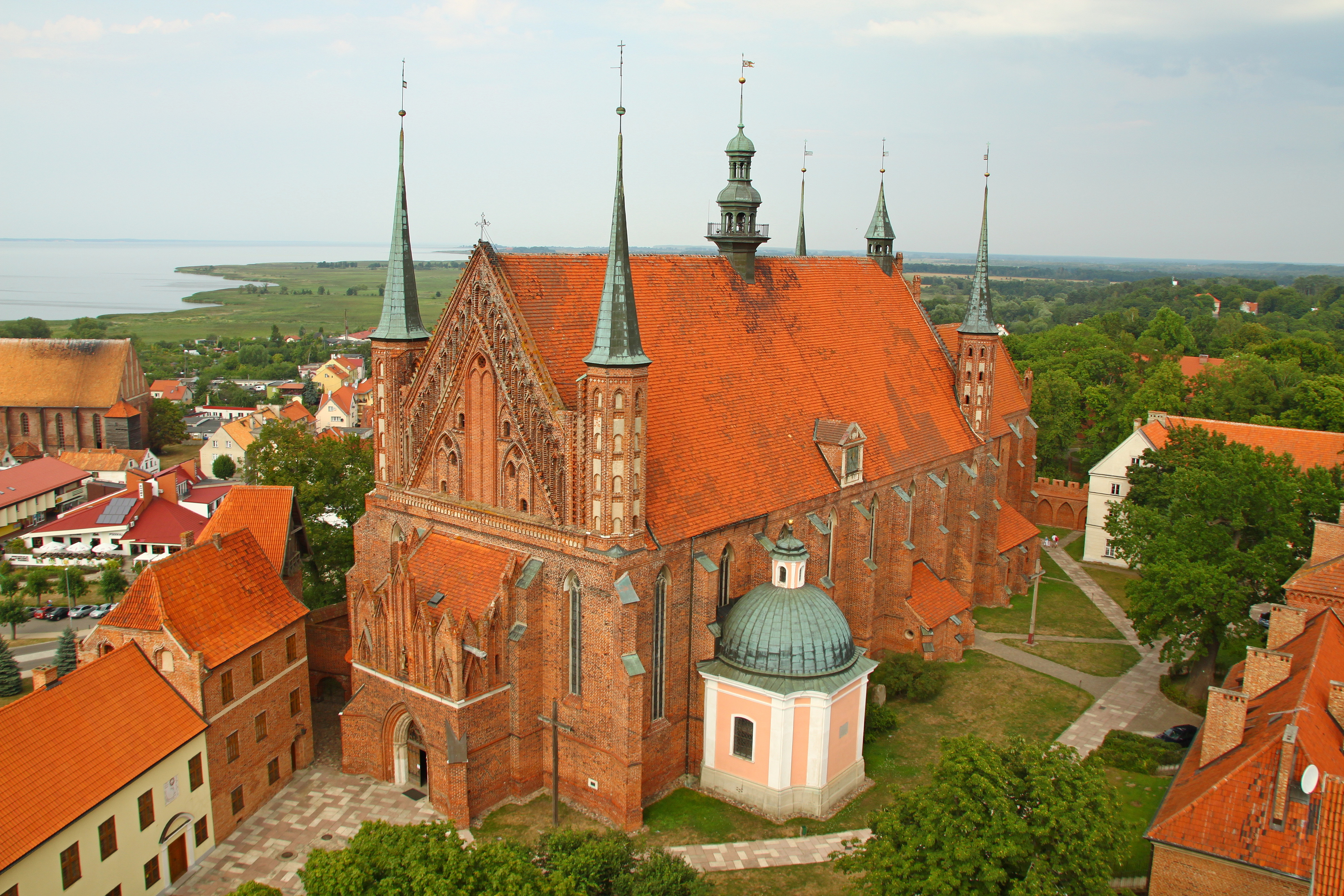
Lidzbark Castle (on the left) was the main seat of the Prince-Bishops of Warmia, and Frombork Cathedral (on the right) was the bishopric's cathedral. Both objects are considered the most precious historic heritage sites of Warmia, and are listed as Historic Monuments of Poland.

Renowned Polish astronomer Nicolaus Copernicus lived in the prince-bishopric, in the towns of Lidzbark, Olsztyn and Frombork, and there he began and completed his groundbreaking work on heliocentrism. In 1521 Copernicus commanded the successful Polish defense of Olsztyn during a siege by the Teutonic Knights during the Polish–Teutonic War (1519–1521).

The Diocese of Warmia lost the two thirds of its diocese within Teutonic Prussia after 1525 when the Order's Grand Master Albert of Brandenburg-Ansbach converted the monastic state into Ducal Prussia, himself ruling as duke. On 10 December 1525, at their session in Königsberg, the Prussian estates established the Lutheran Church in Ducal Prussia by deciding the Church Order.

Thus Bishop Georg von Polenz of Pomesania and Samland, who had converted to Lutheranism in 1523, took over and introduced the Protestant Reformation also in the ducal two thirds of Warmia diocese, territorially surrounding the actual prince-episcopal third. With the formal abolition of the now Lutheran bishopric of Samland in 1587 the now Lutheran Warmian parishes became subject to the Sambian Consistory (later moved to Königsberg). As a result, even within ducal Warmia, the vast majority of burghers had become Lutherans.

After the Council of Trent the later cardinal Stanislaus Hosius (1551–79) held a diocesan synode (1565) and the same year the Jesuits came to Braunsberg. While nearly all of Ducal Prussia took on Lutheranism, the prince-bishops Stanislaus Hosius and Marcin Kromer and the Jesuits were instrumental in keeping much of the prince-episcopal Warmians Catholic. In 1565, Stanislaus Hosius founded the Collegium Hosianum, which would become one of the leading colleges in northern Poland until the Partitions of Poland, and was also the first theological seminary in Poland. The Congregation of St. Catherine, founded at Braniewo by Regina Protmann, engaged in education, especially schooling for girls.

In this period the cathedral chapter mostly elected bishops of Polish nationality. The faithful in the northern part of the diocese were by large majority ethnic Germans, while in the remainder they were overwhelmingly Poles. Following King Sigismund III's contract on regency in Ducal Prussia (1605) with Joachim Frederick of Brandenburg, and his Treaty of Warsaw (1611) with John Sigismund of Brandenburg, confirming the co-enfeoffment of the Berlin Hohenzollern with Ducal Prussia, these two rulers guaranteed free practice of Catholic religion in all of prevailingly Lutheran Ducal Prussia.

Some churches were reconsecrated to or newly built for Catholic worship (e.g., St. Nicholas, Elbląg, Propsteikirche, Königsberg). Those new Catholic churches located in the ducal two thirds of Warmia diocese and in diocesan territory of the suppressed Samland see were then subordinated to the Warmian Frombork see. This development was recognised by the Holy See in 1617 by de jure extending Warmia's jurisdiction over Samland's former diocesan territory, only containing few immigrated Catholics. In practice the ducal government obstructed Catholic exercise in many ways.

Five Prince-Bishops of Warmia resigned from their position to become Archbishops of Gniezno and Primates of Poland, the highest representatives of the Catholic Church in Poland.

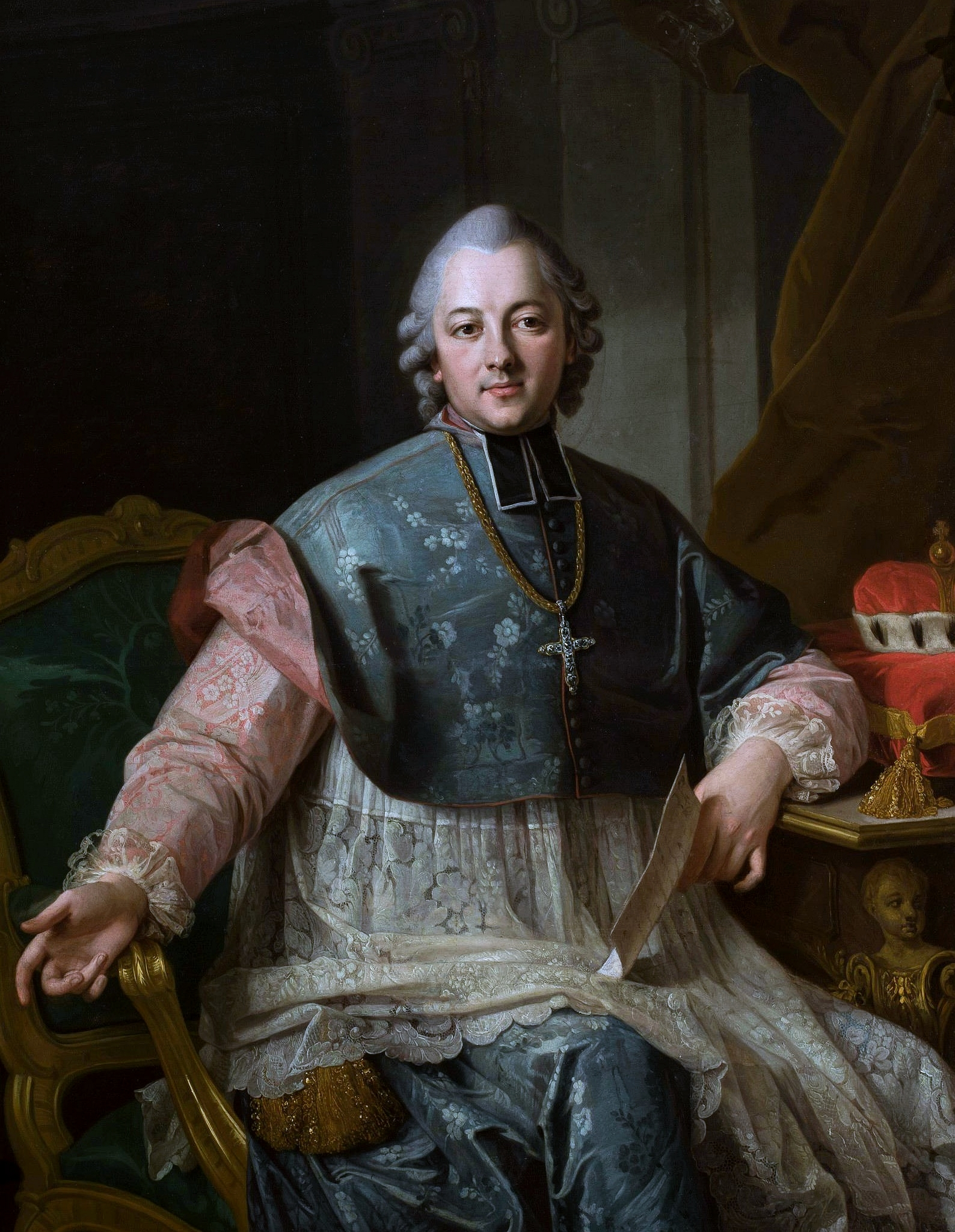
Ignacy Krasicki, leading poet of Polish Enlightenment and last Prince-Bishop of Warmia

As a result of the First Partition of Poland in 1772, Warmia was annexed by the Kingdom of Prussia, and in 1773 incorporated into its newly formed province of East Prussia as bishopric of Ermland.

== Aftermath ==
At the time of the break-up of the Polish-Lithuanian multi-state-kingdom, referred to as First Partition of Poland in 1772, Ermland was incorporated into the Kingdom of Prussia's province of East Prussia.

The bishopric ceased to be an independent governmental unit, and King Frederick II confiscated its property. The prince-bishop, a personal friend of Frederick the Great, the noted Polish author Ignacy Krasicki, though deprived of temporal authority, retained influence at the Prussian court before his reappointment as Archbishop of Gniezno in 1795.

Although the population of the bishopric Ermland remained largely Roman Catholic, religious schools were suppressed. Although there had been schools teaching in the Lithuanian and Polish languages since the 16th century, those languages were forbidden in all schools in East Prussia by decree in 1873.

== See also ==
- Duchy of Siewierz
- List of bishops of Warmia
