= Königsberg Cathedral =

Cathedral in Kaliningrad, Russia

- Russian: Кафедральный собор в Калининграде, romanized: Kafedralny sobor v Kaliningrade; German: Königsberger Dom
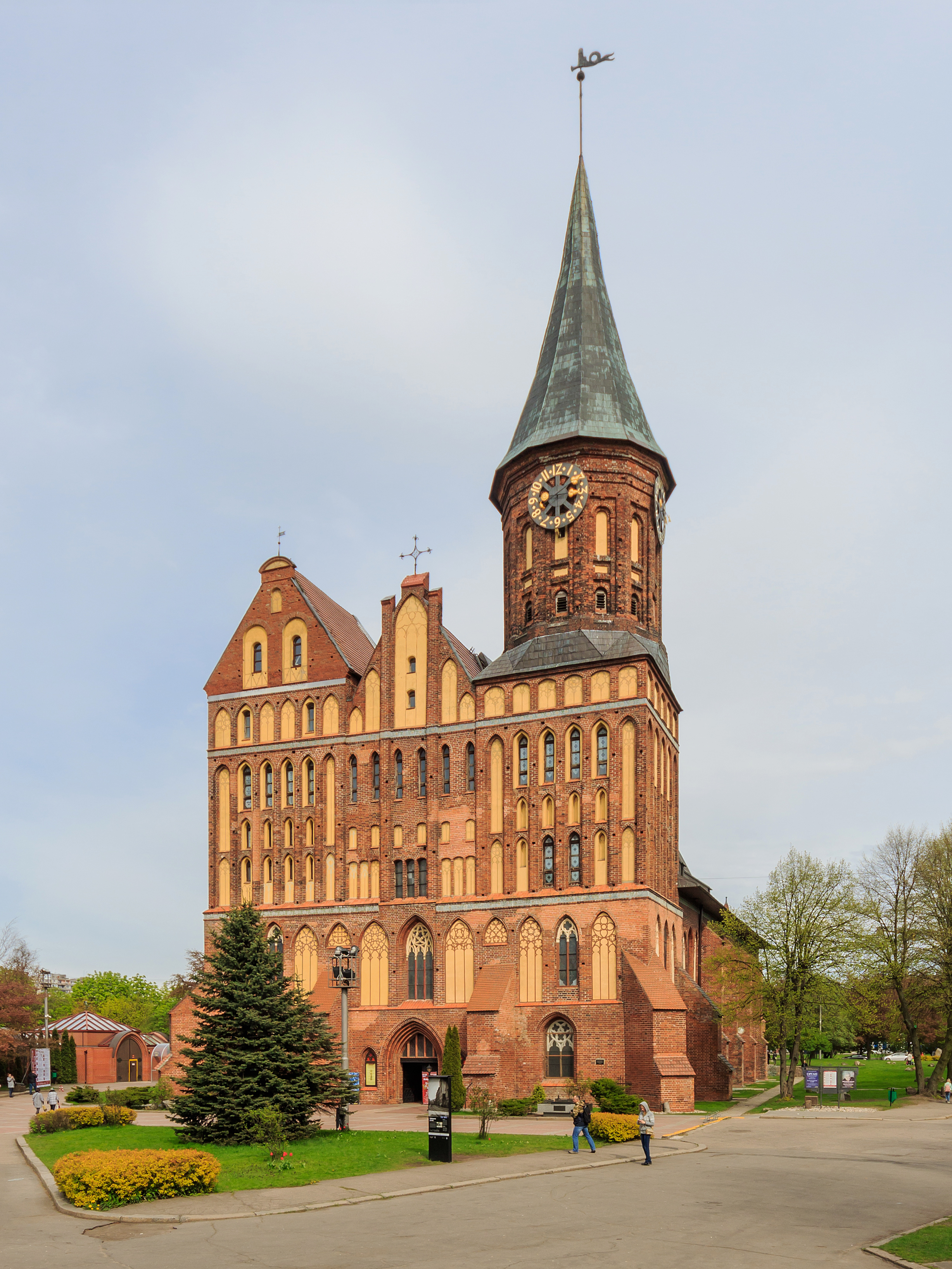
- Front (west side) of the cathedral
- Königsberg Cathedral
- 54°42′23″N 20°30′42″E
- Location: Kneiphof, Kaliningrad, Russia
- Denomination: Lutheran, Catholic, Russian Orthodox
- Previous denomination: Catholic Church
- Website: sobor-kaliningrad.ru

Architecture
- Functional status: Former
- Style: Brick Gothic
- Groundbreaking: c. 1330
- Completed: 1380

Specifications
- Length: 88.5 metres (290 ft)
- Height: 32.14 metres (105.4 ft)

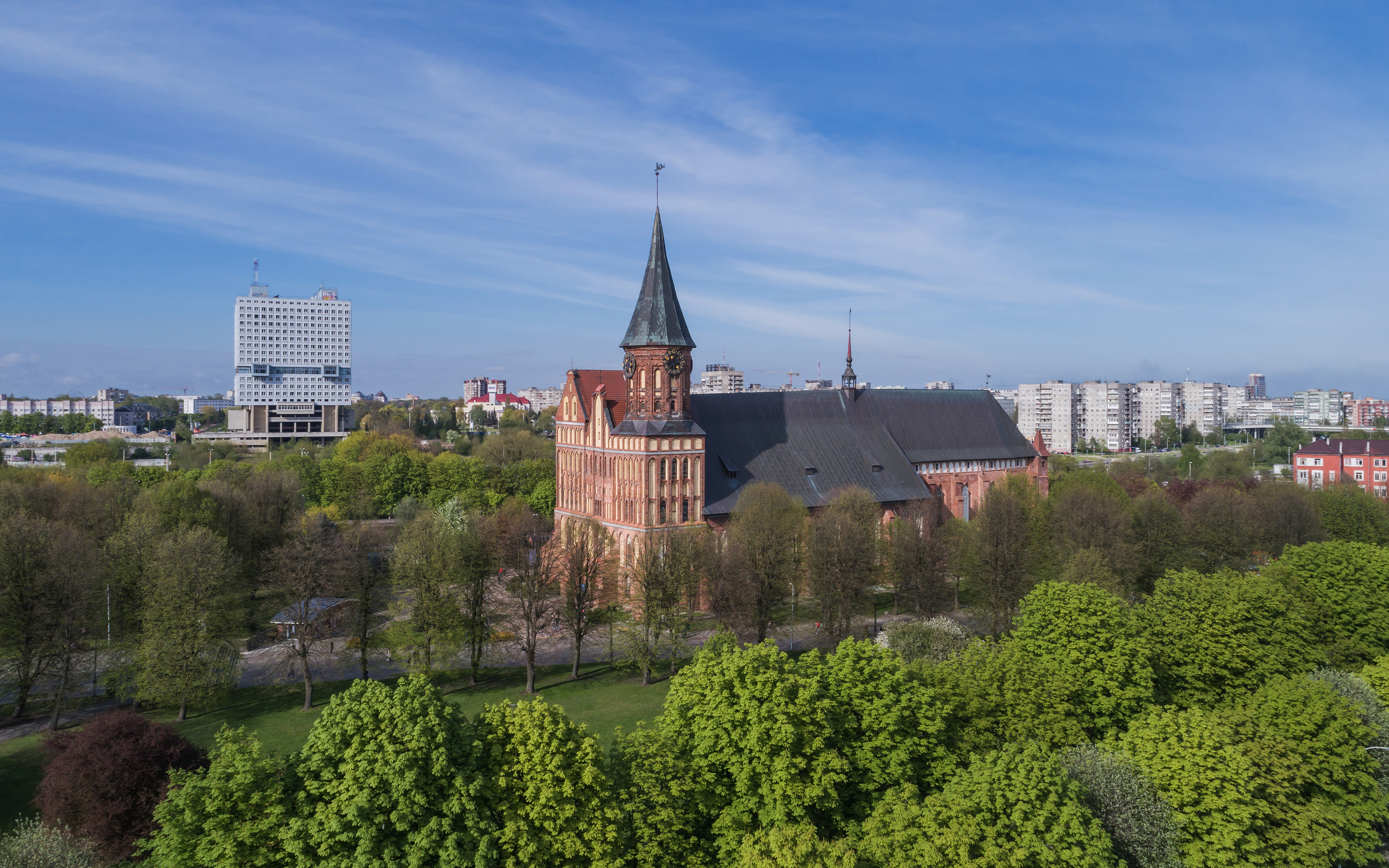
Modern view of the cathedral

Königsberg Cathedral (Russian: Кафедральный собор в Калининграде, romanized: Kafedralny sobor v Kaliningrade; German: Königsberger Dom) is a Brick Gothic-style monument in Kaliningrad, Russia, located on Kneiphof island in the Pregolya river. It is the most significant preserved building of the former city of Königsberg, which was largely destroyed in World War II.

Dedicated to the Virgin Mary and St. Adalbert of Prague, it was built as the see of the Prince-Bishops of Samland in the 14th century. Upon the establishment of the secular Duchy of Prussia, it became the Lutheran Albertina University church in 1544. The spire and roof of the cathedral burnt down after two RAF bombing raids in late August 1944; reconstruction started in 1992, after the dissolution of the Soviet Union.

== History ==
=== 14th century to World War II ===
A first smaller Catholic cathedral was erected in the Königsberg Altstadt between 1297 and 1302. After the Samland bishop Johann Clare had acquired the eastern part of Kneiphof island from the Teutonic Knights in 1322, he and his cathedral chapter had a new see built at the site and ensured its autonomy by a 1333 treaty with Grand Master Luther von Braunschweig.

The construction is considered to have begun about 1330. The original building in Altstadt was subsequently demolished and materials from it were used to build the new cathedral on Kneiphof. The soil on which the cathedral was built was marshy, and so hundreds of oak poles were put into the ground before the construction of the cathedral could begin. After a relatively short period of almost 50 years, the cathedral was largely completed by 1380, while works on the interior frescoes lasted until the end of the 14th century.

The choir contained murals from the 14th and 15th centuries, late Gothic wood carvings, and medieval monuments in the Renaissance style, the chief of which was a statue of Albert, Duke of Prussia, carved by Cornelis Floris de Vriendt in 1570.

The cathedral originally had two spires. The spires (one north and one south) overlooked the entrance (west side) of the cathedral. In 1544, the two spires were destroyed by fire. The south spire was rebuilt, but the north spire was replaced by a simple gable roof. In 1640, a clock was built underneath the rebuilt spire, and from 1650 the famous Wallenrodt Library, donated by Martin von Wallenrodt, was situated underneath the gable roof.

In 1695, an organ was installed in the cathedral. In the 19th century, the organ was restored and then renewed.

On 27 September 1523, Johann Briesmann gave the first Lutheran sermon in the cathedral. From then on, until 1945, the cathedral remained Protestant. Also Polish-language church services were held there from the 16th to the 18th century.

Albert, Duke of Prussia, and some of his relatives, as well as other dignitaries, were buried in the cathedral.

=== Pre–World War II photos ===
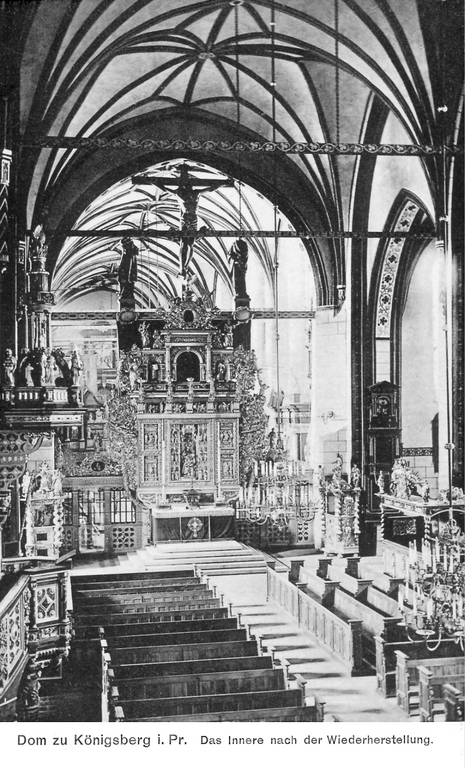
Inside the cathedral

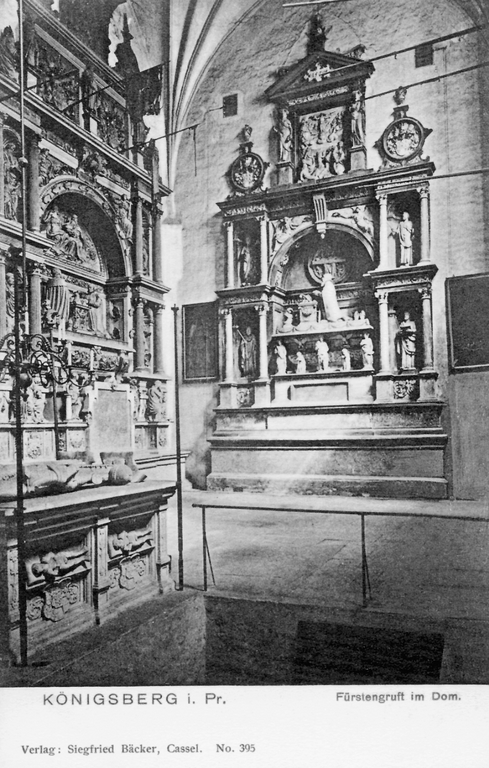
Tomb of Albert, Duke of Prussia

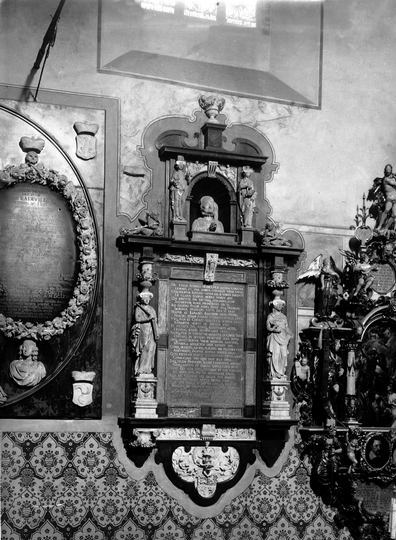
Epitaph of Dorothea of Denmark, Duchess of Prussia

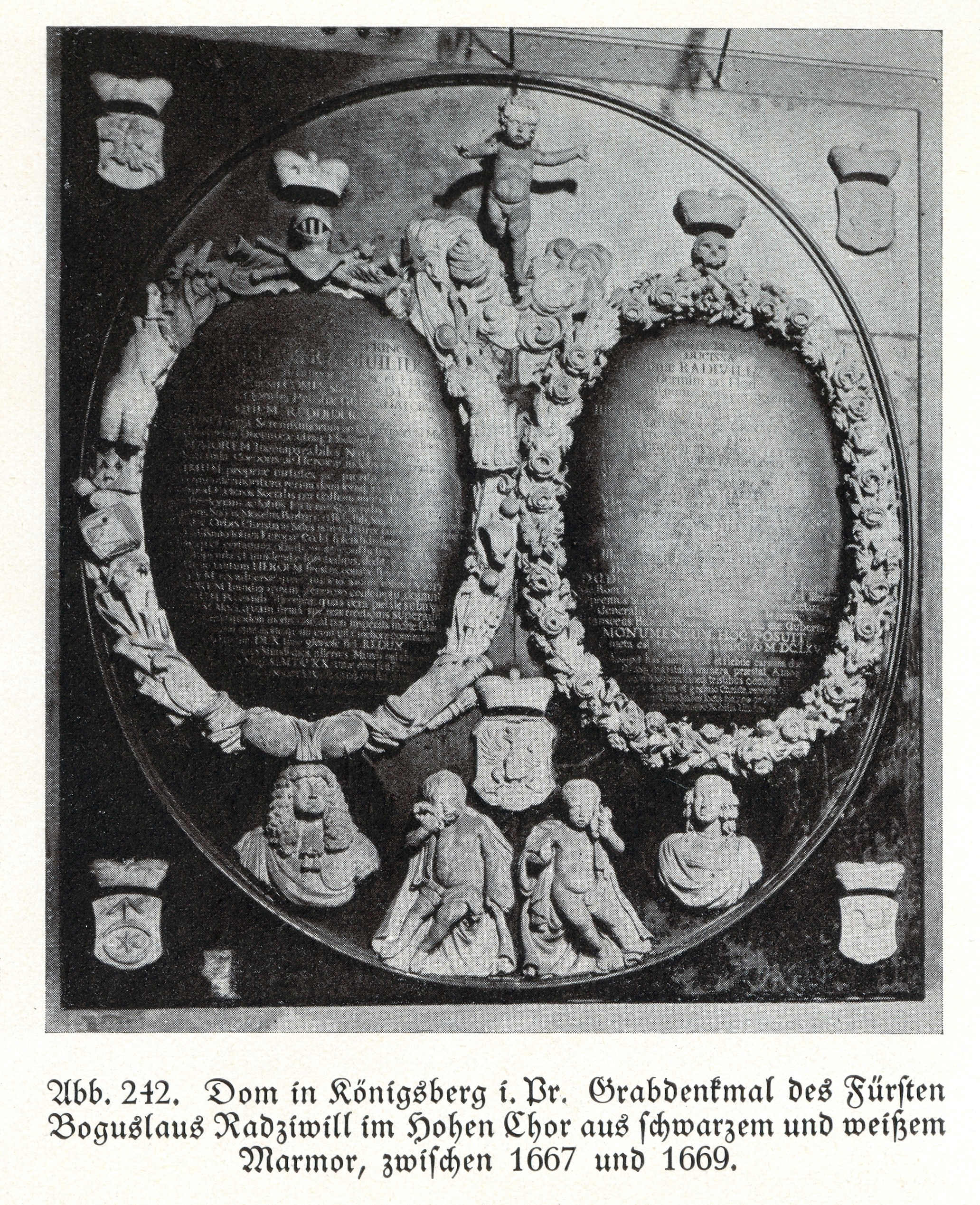
Epitaph of Bogusław Radziwiłł

=== World War II ===
Königsberg was the capital of East Prussia from the Late Middle Ages until 1945, and the easternmost large German city until it was conquered by the Soviet Union near the end of World War II.

In late August 1944, British bombers carried out two-night raids on Königsberg. The first raid, on 26/27 August, largely missed the city, but the second raid, on 30/31, destroyed most of the old part of Königsberg (including Kneiphof), and the cathedral was hit. The part of the cathedral directly underneath the spire (today's Lutheran chapel) is where more or less 40 citizens of Königsberg survived during the second air raid. During reconstruction in 1992, hundreds of skeletons, mostly of children, were discovered under tons of rubble in that area. The investigations of a witness who was among the survivors call in question the identity of the children as victims of the British air raid and consider a connection of the mass grave with the clearance of the East Prussian satellite camps of Stutthof in January 1945.

=== Post–World War II ===
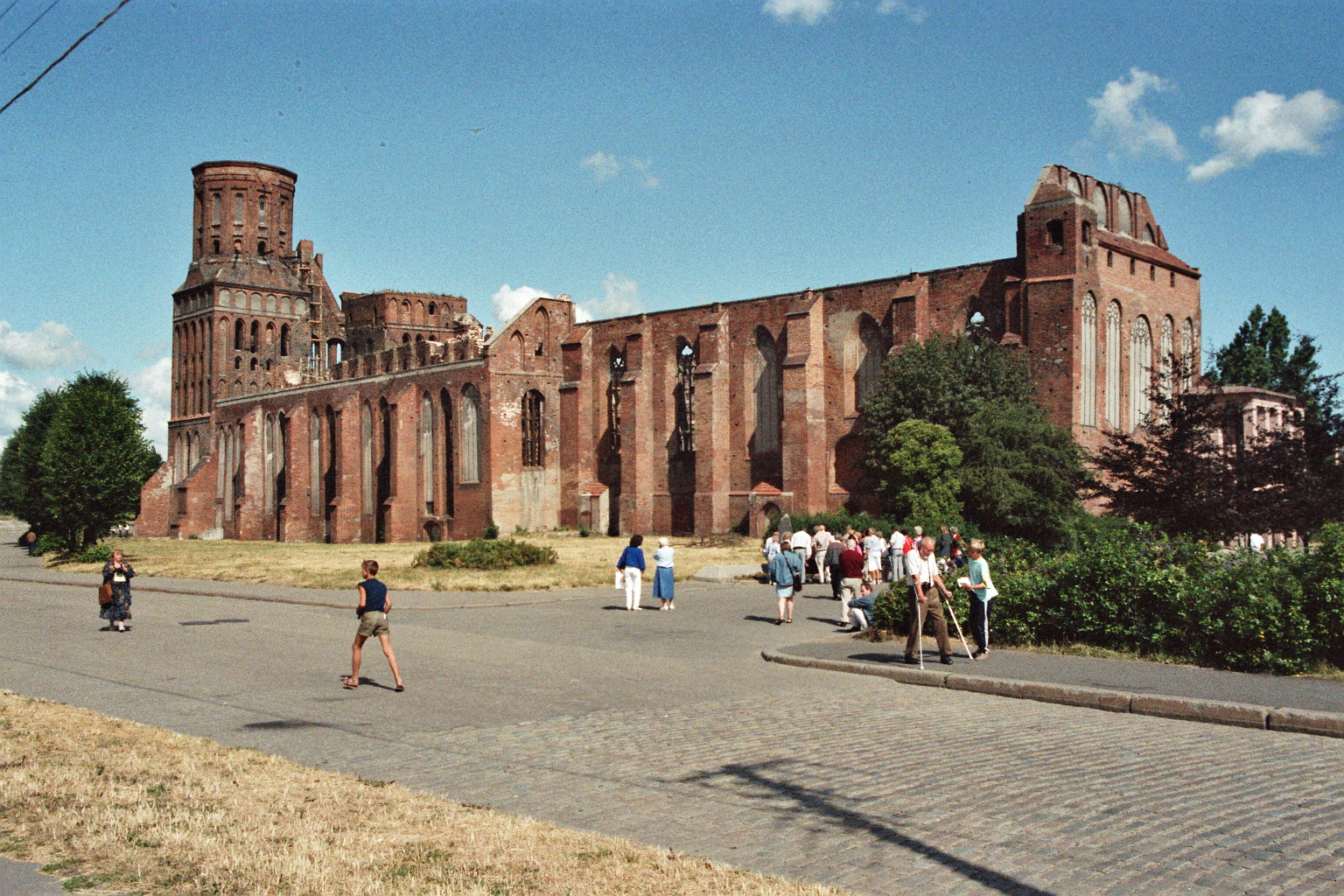
The cathedral in 1982, prior to its restoration in the 1990s

After the war, the cathedral remained a burnt-out shell and Kneiphof was made into a park with no other buildings. Before the war, Kneiphof had many buildings. One of the buildings was the first Albertina University building, where Immanuel Kant taught, which was situated next to the east side of the cathedral. New construction nearby includes the House of Soviets.

Shortly after Kaliningrad was opened to foreigners in the early 1990s after the fall of the Soviet Union, work began to reconstruct the cathedral. In 1994, a new spire was put in place using a helicopter. In 1995, a new clock was put in place. The clock has four bells (1,180 kg, 700 kg, 500 kg & 200 kg), all cast in 1995. The clock chimes every quarter of an hour. On the hour, the clock chimes by playing the first notes of Ludwig van Beethoven's Symphony No. 5, followed by monotonic chiming to indicate the hour. Between 1996 and 1998, work was done to construct the roof. Work was also done to put in stained glass windows.

One problem during the reconstruction was the subsidence of the cathedral which had happened over time. Even during German times, the subsidence had been evident.

In 2002, the architectural image of the cathedral was registered with the Ministry of Culture as a trademark. As a result, the State Institution “Cathedral” is entitled to receive 0.5% of revenue generated from commercial activities involving the use of the cathedral’s image, such as the sale of postcards and other goods bearing its depiction, including, for example, “Sobornye” cigarettes and “Vostochnoprusskaya” vodka. According to the director of the State Institution “Cathedral”, the funds obtained in this way are intended for the restoration of the cathedral.

In 2007–2008, a marble epitaph of 17th-century Polish princely magnate Bogusław Radziwiłł and his wife Anna Maria was renovated with funds from the Polish Ministry of Culture and National Heritage.

Today, the cathedral has two chapels—one Lutheran, the other Russian Orthodox—as well as a museum. The cathedral is also used for concerts.

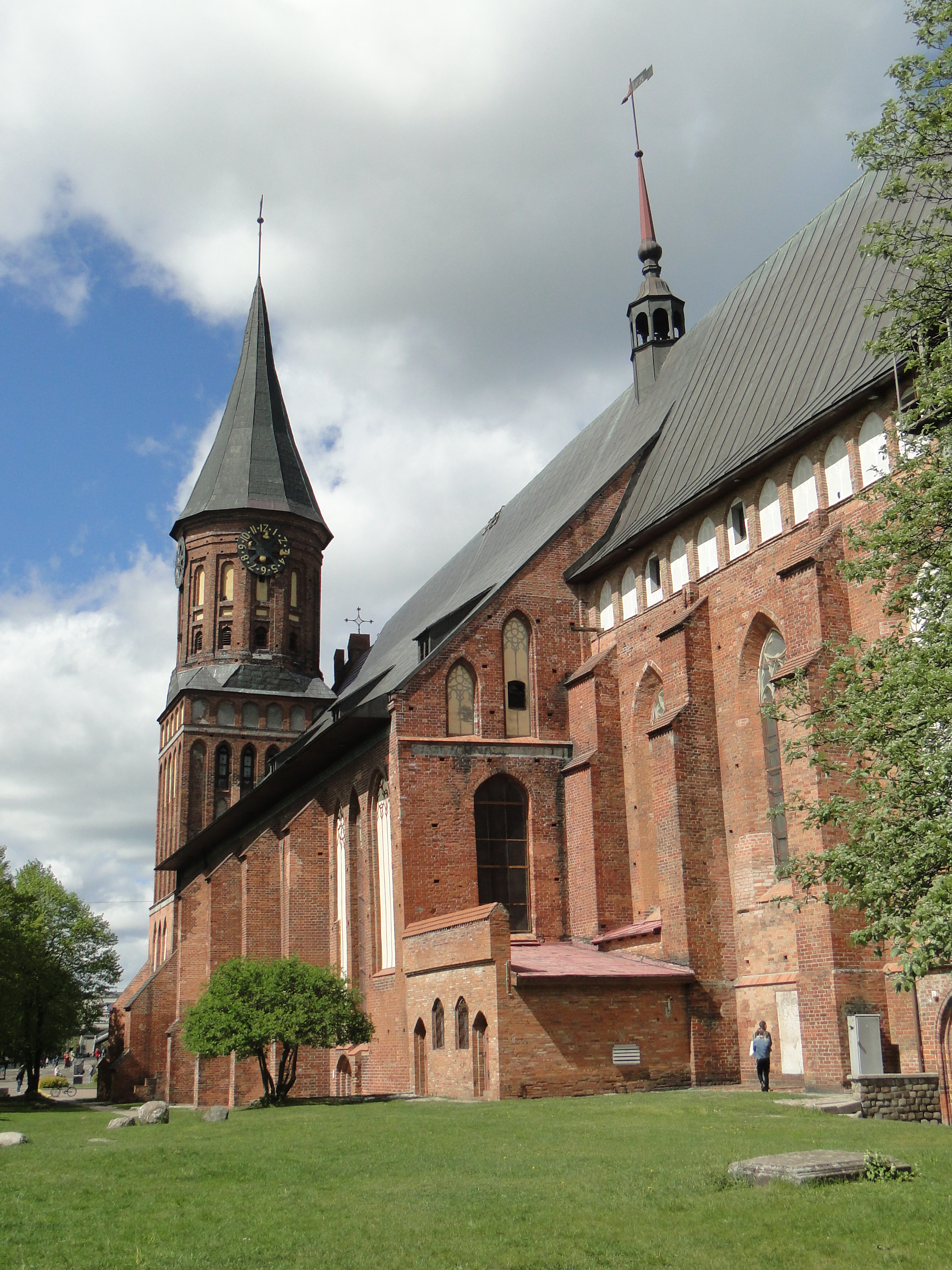
Königsberg (Kaliningrad) cathedral

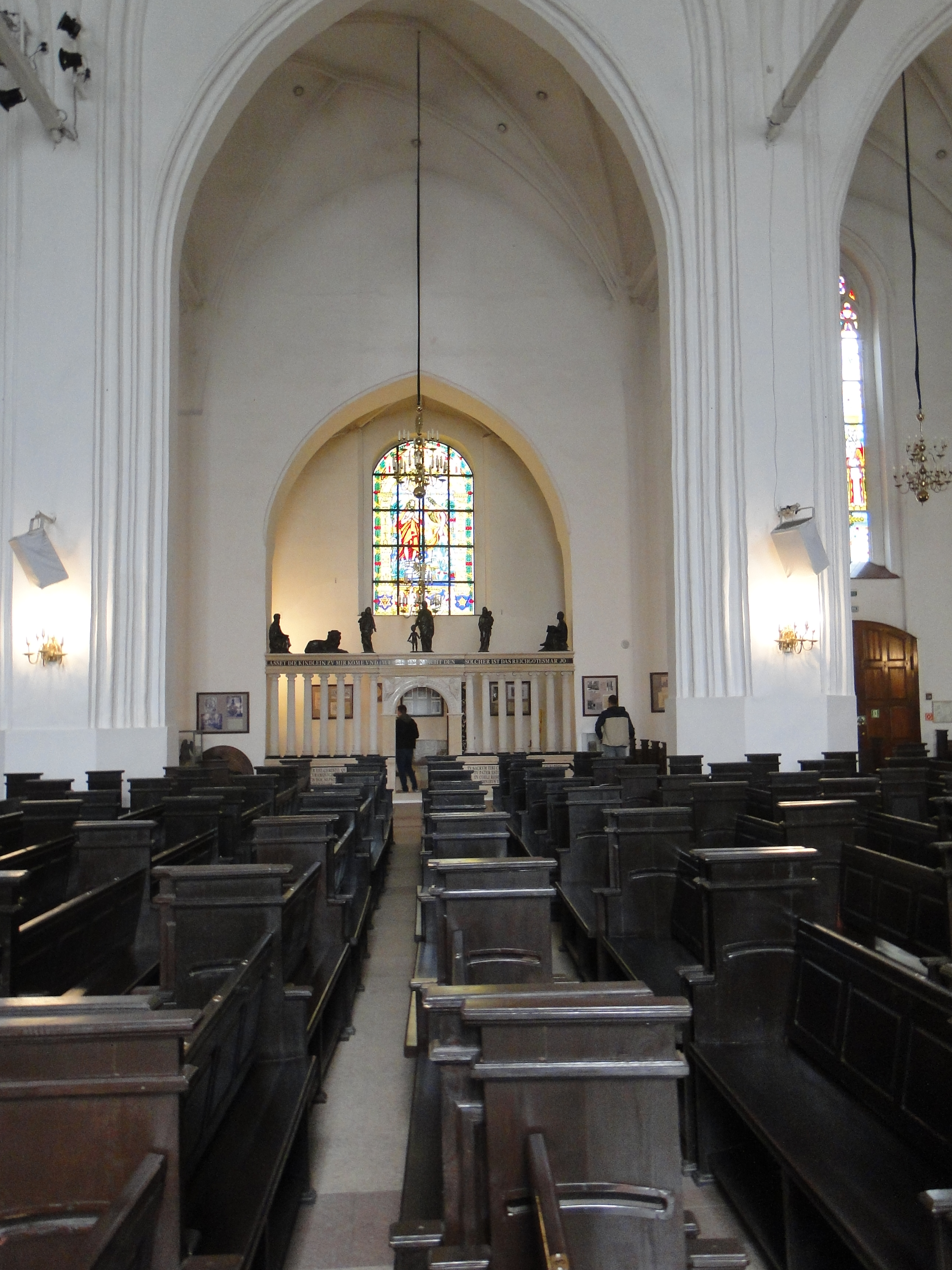
Inside the cathedral

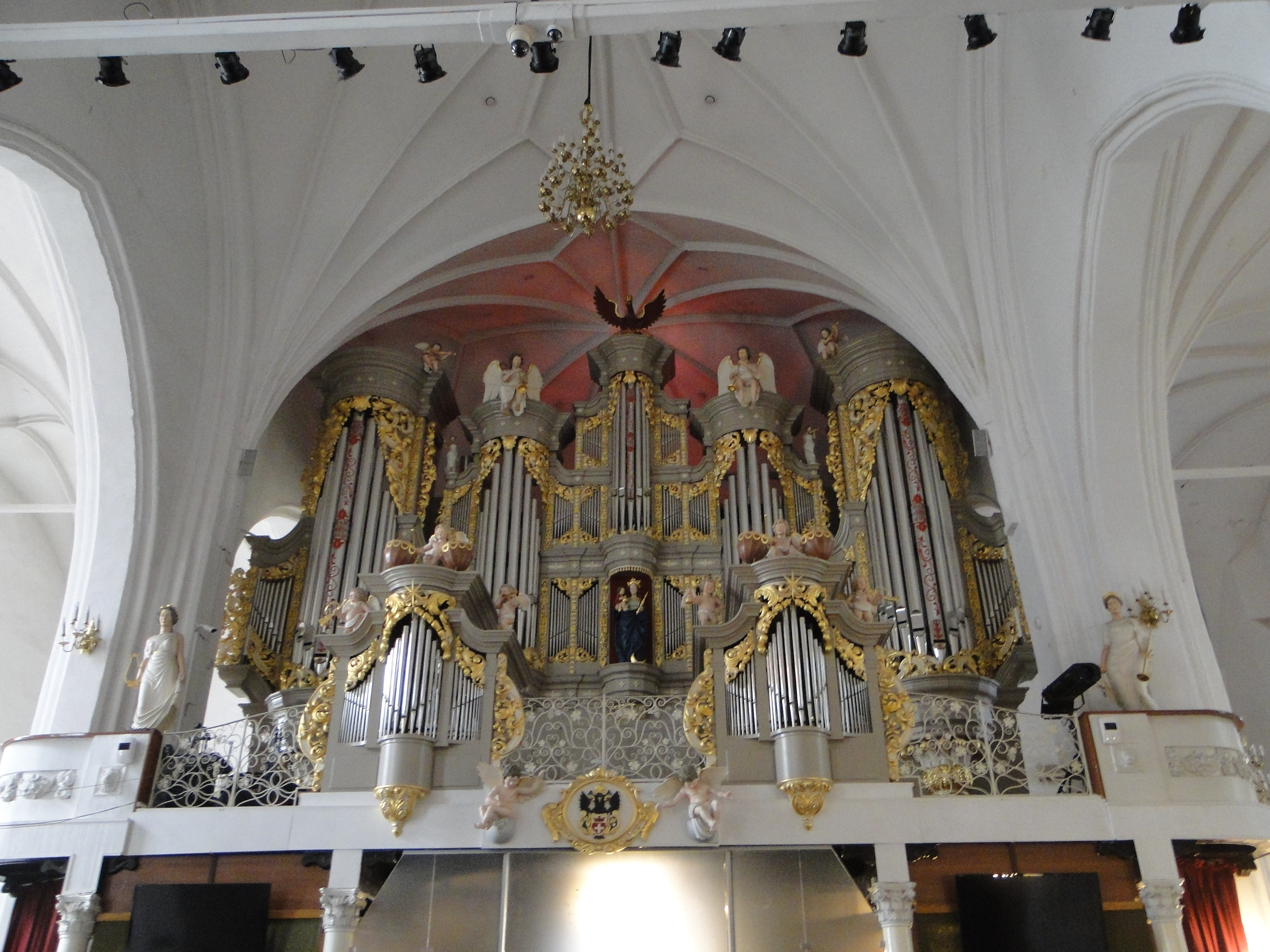
The new organ

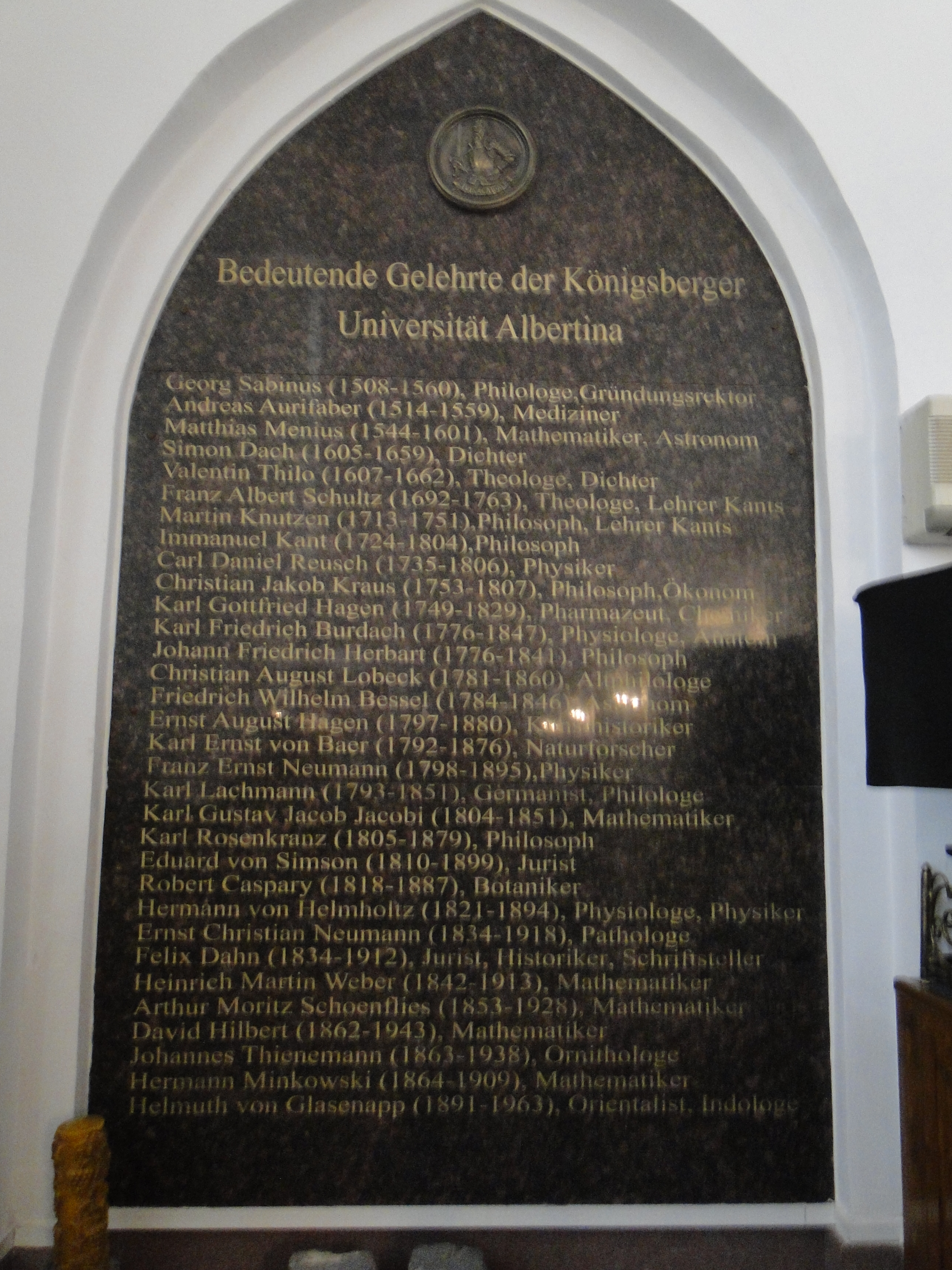
The list of outstanding scientists from the University of Königsberg in the cathedral

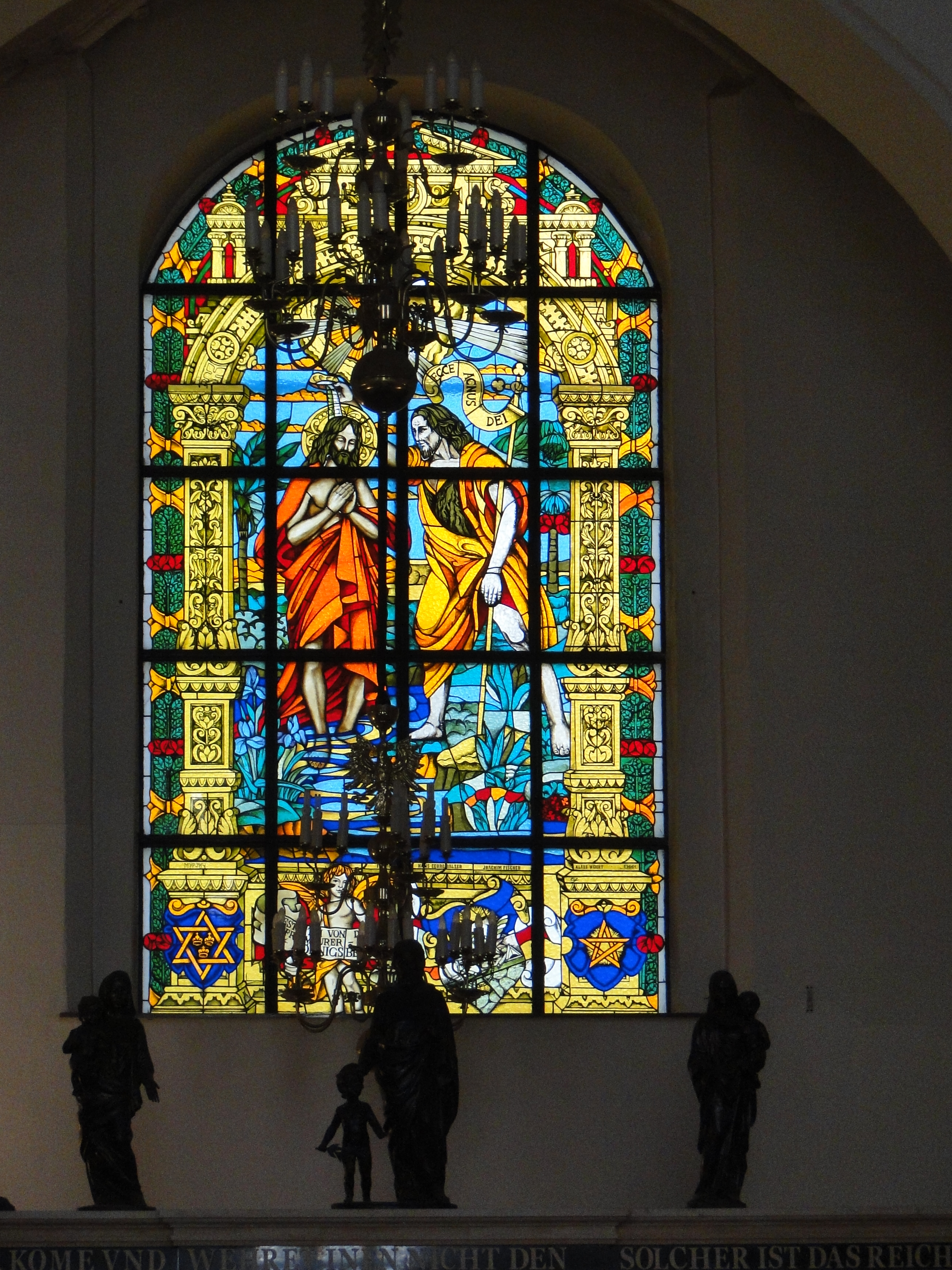
Restored glass window

== Kant's tomb ==
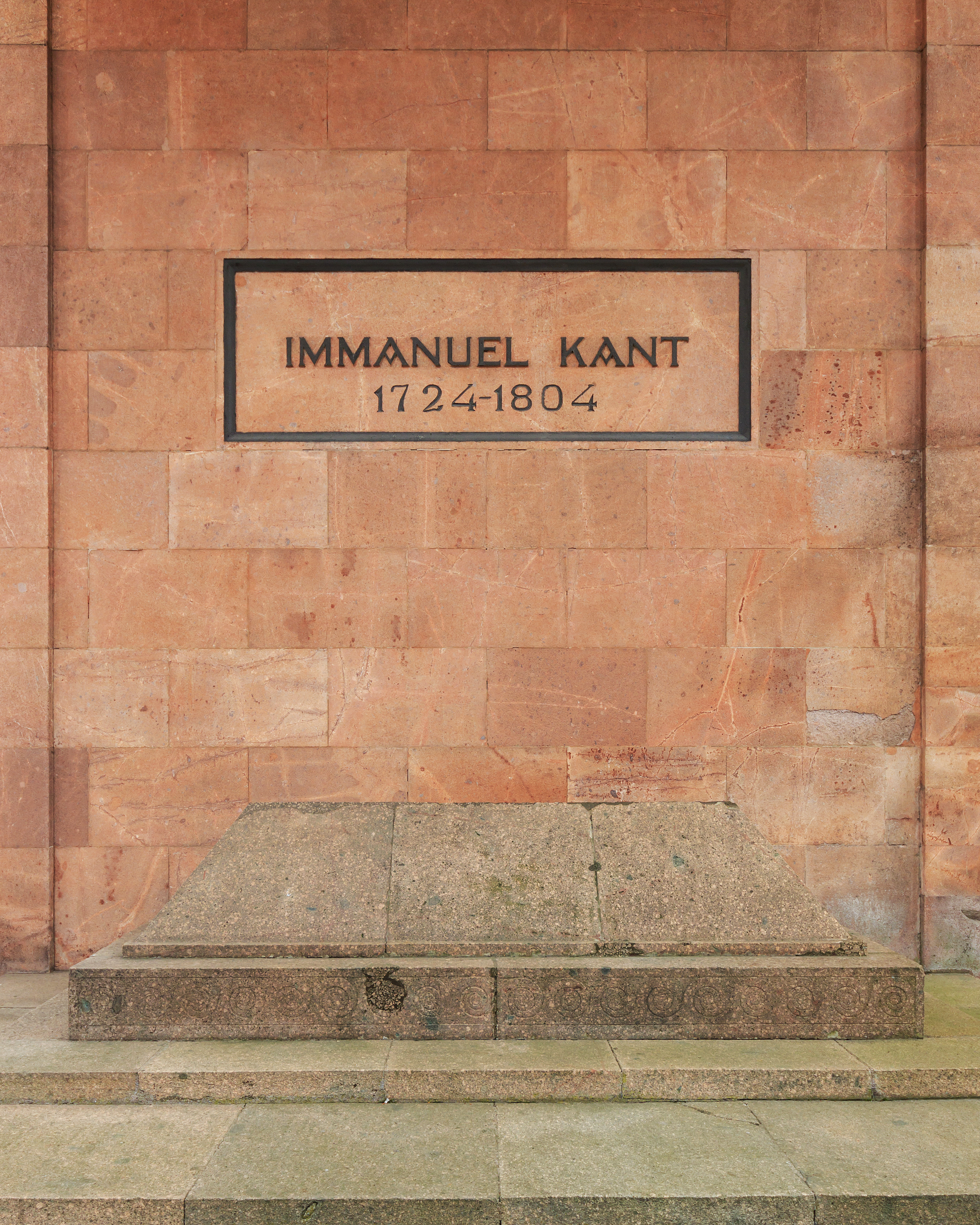
Tomb of Immanuel Kant at Königsberg Cathedral

The tomb of the philosopher Immanuel Kant, the "Sage of Königsberg", is today in a mausoleum adjoining the northeast corner of the cathedral. The mausoleum was constructed by the architect Friedrich Lahrs and was finished in 1924 in time for the bicentenary of Kant's birth. Originally, Kant was buried inside the cathedral, but in 1880 his remains were moved outside and placed in a neo-Gothic chapel adjoining the northeast corner of the cathedral. Over the years, the chapel became dilapidated before it was demolished to make way for the mausoleum, which was built on the same spot, where it is today.

On 27 November 2018, Kant's tomb and statue near Immanuel Kant Baltic Federal University were vandalised with pink paint by unknown assailants, who also scattered leaflets glorifying Rus' and denouncing him as a "traitor". The incident was apparently connected with a vote to rename Khrabrovo Airport, where Kant was in the lead for a while, prompting Russian nationalist resentment.

== Other burials ==
- Heinrich Reuß von Plauen
- Johann von Tiefen
- Martin Truchseß von Wetzhausen
- Stanislovas Rapolionis
- Luther von Braunschweig
- Ludwig von Erlichshausen
- Heinrich Reffle von Richtenberg
- Albert, Duke of Prussia
- Bogusław Radziwiłł
