= Frederick of Saxony (Teutonic Knight) =

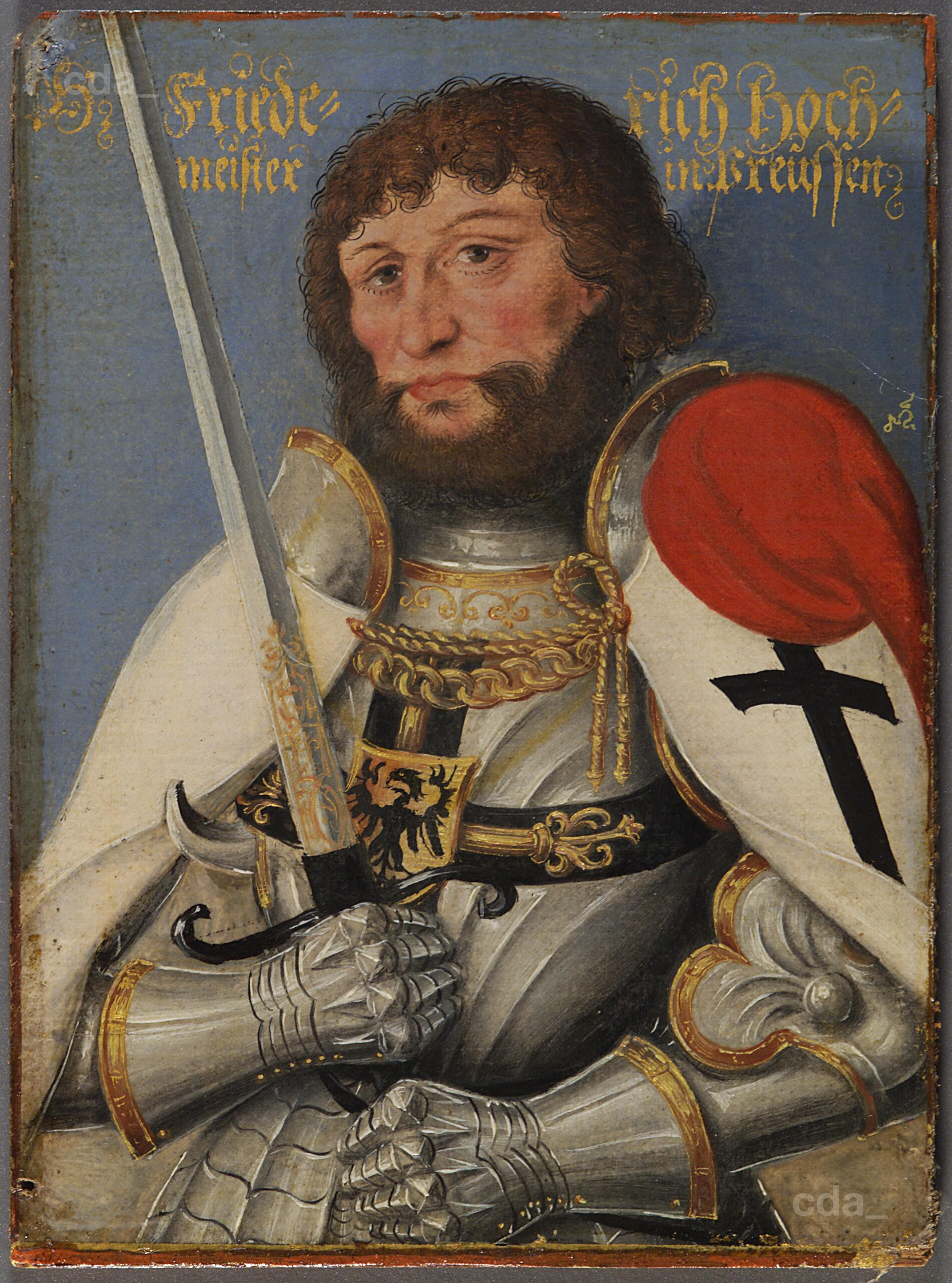
- Portrait by Lucas Cranach the Younger

Grand Master of the Teutonic Knights
- Reign: 1498–1510
- Predecessor: Johann von Tiefen
- Successor: Albert of Brandenburg-Ansbach
- Born: 26 October 1473; Torgau
- Died: 14 December 1510 (aged 37); Rochlitz
- House: House of Wettin
- Father: Albert III, Duke of Saxony
- Mother: Sidonie of Poděbrady
- Religion: Roman Catholic

Duke Frederick of Saxony (26 October 1473 – 14 December 1510), also known as Friedrich von Sachsen or Friedrich von Wettin, was the 36th Grand Master of the Teutonic Order, serving from 1498–1510. He was the third (and youngest surviving) son of Albert III, Duke of Saxony, and Sidonie of Poděbrady, daughter of George of Podebrady.

Born prematurely seven months after his immediate elder sibling in Torgau, Frederick was a member of the Albertine line, the junior branch of the prestigious House of Wettin which ruled Saxony. Frederick should not be confused with his cousin of the same name from the Ernestine line, who ruled the Electorate of Saxony. Frederick's older brother George had married Barbara, a sister of King John I Albert of Poland.

The Teutonic Order had been in a long power struggle with Poland over Prussia. The Order's fortunes had declined throughout the 15th century, and they hoped that selecting someone connected by marriage to the ruling Jagiellon dynasty of Poland would strengthen their position. The young duke was elected Grand Master in 1498.

When John I Albert summoned Frederick to do homage for the Order's holdings, he referred the matter to the Imperial Reichstag. The Reichstag informed John I Albert that he could not interfere in the Grand Master's free exercise of power in Prussia. Frederick's delaying tactics were assisted by the quick succession of three Polish kings during his 12 years in office.

Frederick died in Rochlitz. By custom, Grand Masters of the Order did not marry, so he had neither wife nor descendants.

Grand Master of the Teutonic Order
| Preceded by Johann von Tiefen | Hochmeister; 1498–1510 | Succeeded by Albert of Brandenburg-Ansbach |
