= War of the Priests (1467–1479) =

15th-century war in Poland

The War of the Priests (1467–1479, German: Pfaffenkrieg, Polish: wojna popia, wojna księża) was a conflict in the Polish province of Warmia between the King of Poland Casimir IV and Nicolaus von Tüngen, the new bishop of Warmia chosen – without the king's approval – by the Warmian chapter. The latter was supported by the Teutonic Knights, by this point vassals of Poland, who were seeking a revision of the recently signed Second Peace of Toruń.

== Political background ==
The Bishopric of Warmia was, in the 14th century, part of the Monastic State of the Teutonic Knights, but enjoyed autonomy and was administrated as a prince-bishopric. The bishops, often members of the Teutonic Order, were loyal to the order even in early 15th century, when the Teutonic Knights raised the taxes to pay for the resulting costs of Polish–Lithuanian–Teutonic War. Eventually, the order's policies and tax increases led to opposition within Prussia and to the foundation of the Prussian Confederation in 1440 by Prussian cities who wanted to defend their rights against the order.

The Prussian Confederation eventually asked for external aid and allied with the Polish king Casimir IV, asking to be incorporated into the Kingdom of Poland. This led to the Thirteen Years' War (1454–1466). The bishop of Warmia, Paul von Legendorf (1458–1467), joined the Prussian Confederation in the last year of the conflict (1466). The Second Peace of Thorn (1466) put Royal Prussia under the suzerainty of the Polish king. As part of the treaty, the king of Poland had the right to approve the bishop of Warmia, as chosen by the Warmian chapter.

== Election dispute ==
In 1467, the chapter chose as bishop Nicolaus von Tüngen, while the Polish king promoted Wincenty Kiełbasa (at the time Bishop of Chełm) for the position. It was Tüngen who was approved by the pope, but he was unable to take the seat de facto and instead resided in Riga. Unable to get the pope's approval for Kiełbasa, Casimir changed tack and nominated Andrzej Oporowski, his chancellor, as bishop (Tüngen was to receive the Bishopric of Kamień). Oporowski however, unlike Kiełbasa, did not have the support of the Prussian estates as he was not from the region.

This resulted in a dispute in which Tüngen was supported by the Teutonic Order and Matthias Corvinus, the king of Hungary. With help from the Order Tüngen was able to come to Warmia in 1472. In 1476 Corvinus invaded southern Poland and a year later Heinrich Reffle von Richtenberg, the grand master of the order, refused to provide military support to Casimir, his sovereign.

Casimir responded by courting the support of the Prussian Estates and cities. He granted Chełmno Law to several cities, affirmed existing privileges and withdrew the candidature of Oporowski. As a result, the Prussians re-swore their fealty to the king of Poland and refused to support the order. Likewise, Gdańsk, the largest city in Polish Royal Prussia declined to support to the Order and Corvinus.

== Military action ==
In 1477 Martin von Wetzhausen, the new grand master of the order refused to make his oath of fealty to the Polish king and invaded Warmia, taking Chełm and Starogard Chełminski. In response, in 1478, Polish forces of King Casimir IV intervened militarily, besieging Braniewo. Under the command of Jan Biały and Piotr Dunin, the Polish forces occupied several cities in Warmia and Pomesania. The Teutonic Knights' military operations were hampered by the refusal of the Prussian Estates to support them. Tüngen was forced to flee to Königsberg (Królewiec). At the same time, in April 1479, the Polish and Hungarian kings came to an agreement and Corvinus withdrew from the anti-Polish alliance.

As a consequence by July 1479, both Tüngen and the grand master were forced to pay homage to the Polish king.

== Settlement ==
The first Treaty of Piotrków (in Piotrków Trybunalski) ended the feud in 1479. The Polish king accepted Nicolaus von Tüngen, who had been elected in 1467, as bishop, and granted or confirmed several prerogatives of the bishopric. The bishop acknowledged the sovereignty of the Polish king over Warmia, obliged the chapter to elect only candidates "liked by the Polish king" and the Warmians had to pledge allegiance to him. Politically Warmia remained under lordship of the Polish crown.
