= Heinrich Reuß von Plauen =

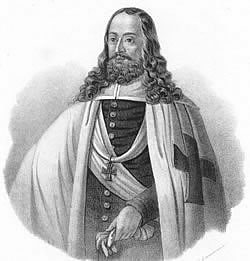

Grand Master of the Teutonic Knights
- Reign: 1469–1470
- Predecessor: Ludwig von Erlichshausen
- Successor: Heinrich Reffle von Richtenberg
- Born: c.1400 Plauen, Saxony
- Died: 2 January 1470; Königsberg, State of the Teutonic Order
- Burial: Königsberg Cathedral
- House: House of Reuß

Heinrich Reuß von Plauen (died 2 January 1470) was the 32nd Grand Master of the Teutonic Order, serving from 1467 to 1470. He was the nephew of the previous Grand Master, Ludwig von Erlichshausen, and a distant relative to the 27th Grand Master, Heinrich von Plauen.

== Biography ==
Reuß von Plauen came from the Reuss family from Plauen, Saxony. Incidentally, the family named every male child Heinrich (Henry). Earlier, the brothers Heinrich Reuss von Plauen the Elder and Heinrich Reuss von Plauen the Younger had served in the Thirteen Years' War.

Reuß von Plauen joined the Teutonic Order at a young age. He was first a brother in a monastery in Germany. Reuß von Plauen arrived in Prussia in the 1420s when he became the Vogt of Dirschau. In 1433 he became the Komtur of Balga and in 1440 the Vogt of Natangia. From 1441, Reuß von Plauen held the position of the Grand Hospitaller and the Komtur of Elbing (Elbląg). As the Grand Master's nephew, his influence in the Order grew and he advanced quickly. He took control of the Order's army during the Thirteen Years' War and became famous for destroying the Polish army in the Battle of Konitz. After the Second Peace of Thorn in 1466, Reuß von Plauen became the Komtur of Preußisch Holland.

After the 1467 death of his uncle, Grand Master Ludwig von Erlichshausen, Reuß von Plauen assumed control over of the Teutonic Order without having been elected Grand Master. He settled in Mohrungen and waited for further moves of King Casimir IV Jagiellon of Poland, hesitating to call the meeting of the Order's capitulum to elect him de jure. Pressured by Casimir, he finally called the capitulum in 1469 to Königsberg. This was just a formality as the decision was unanimous and Reuß von Plauen was declared the 32nd Grand Master of the Teutonic Order on 17 October 1469.

Reuß von Plauen went to Piotrków Trybunalski to attend the sejm where he paid homage to Casimir IV. On his way back to Prussia he suffered a stroke and became paralyzed which made further travel impossible. Reuß von Plauen died in Mohrungen on 2 January 1470 and was buried in Königsberg Cathedral.

Grand Master of the Teutonic Order
Preceded by Ludwig von Erlichshausen	Hochmeister; 1469–1470	Succeeded by Heinrich Reffle von Richtenberg
