= Nicolaus von Tüngen =

Nicolaus von Tüngen (Polish Mikołaj Tungen; German: Nikolaus von Tüngen; died 14 February 1489 in Heilsberg (Lidzbark Warmiński)) was bishop of Warmia from 1467 until 1489.

== Life ==
Nicolaus von Tüngen came from a Teutonic Prussian burgher family in Tüngen (Bogatyńskie) near Wormditt (Orneta) in Ermland (Warmia). He worked in the Roman Curia for many years as a secretary, and accumulated many church offices, including in 1459 becoming Canon of Breslau (Wrocław) and Canon of Warmia. After the death of Warmia's Bishop Paul von Legendorf, Tüngen was chosen as his successor by the Warmia diocese chapter on 10 August 1467. Tüngen received the pope's agreement for his nomination on 4 November 1468 and obtained the bishop's insignia in Rome.

The king of Poland, Casimir IV, did not accept the choice of Tüngen as bishop. He instead nominated Wincenty Kiełbasa, the bishop of Chełmno (Kulm) and administrator of the Poznań diocese, as the new bishop of Warmia. The Warmia chapter accepted the king's will, entrusting Kiełbasa with temporary administration of the Warmia diocese at Malbork (Marienburg) Sejmik) on 1 December 1467. Tüngen did not withdraw his candidacy, however, and soon the papal provision strengthened Tüngen's position. In September 1469, Kiełbasa withdrew his claim to the Warmia bishopric. One year later, Tüngen unofficially arrived in Warmia.

Kiełbasa's resignation did not mean the resignation of the Polish king from his aim of putting his own candidate in office. Casimir IV intervened with the pope, Paul II, who ordered Tüngen to resign the Warmia bishopric (his successor, Pope Sixtus IV, nominated Tüngen bishop of Kammin). The new candidate nominated for the post in 1471 was Andrzej Oporowski, archdeacon of Gniezno and a royal secretary.

Oporowski's nomination did not change the situation in Warmia. The nominee was not allowed to assume his office because of protests from the clergy and people of Warmia and the Prussian Estates. At the same time, Nicolaus of Tüngen began to strive to obtain his desired bishopric. Supported by the Teutonic Knights, Tüngen gained control of most of Warmia's castles and towns. He also gained the support of the king of Hungary, Matthias Corvinus, then in conflict with Poland, entrusting him with protecting the bishopric.

In 1478, Polish forces intervened militarily in Warmia and regained control of most of it. This armed conflict is known as the War of the Priests (1467–1479).

In 1479, an agreement reached between Casimir II and Matthias Corvinus further weakened Tüngen's position. Peace negotiations to end the conflict took place in Piotrków Trybunalski. The agreement reached on 15 July 1479 affirmed that Warmia was under the Polish king's sovereignty and required the bishops of Warmia to swear an oath of fealty to him. The Warmia chapter was also required to elect as bishop a person to the liking of the king. As part of the agreement, Tüngen was allowed to remain Bishop of Warmia, after he paid homage to the king, entitling him to be a senator of Poland, like other Polish bishops.

After 1479, bishop Tüngen made efforts to rebuild the diocese after the devastations caused by the war. Tüngen funded the altar in St. George's church in Königsberg, and in his will he gave large sums to the monasteries and churches of the diocese.

== Death and legacy ==
Tüngen made efforts in Rome to nominate Lucas Watzenrode as coadjutor bishop. These efforts were interrupted by his death, yet his will was respected when the diocese chapter selected Watzenrode as the next bishop, taking advantage of the fact that the 1479 agreement did not specify which candidate was to be chosen.

== Bibliography ==
- Schmauch, H.: Der Kampf zwischen dem ermländischen Bischof Nikolaus von Tüngen und Polen oder der Pfaffenkrieg (1467-1479). In: Z. Gesch. Altertumskde. Ermlands, Bd. 25, S. 69-186.
- Piotr Nitecki, Biskupi Kościoła w Polsce w latach 965-1999, Warszawa 2000
- Tadeusz Oracki, Słownik biograficzny Warmii, Prus Książęcych i Ziemi Malborskiej od połowy XV do końca XVIII wieku, Olsztyn 1988
- Jerzy Sikorski, Prywatne życie Mikołaja Kopernika, Olsztyn 1985
- Alojzy Szorc, Dzieje diecezji warmińskiej (1243-1991), Olsztyn 1991

Catholic Church titles
Regnal titles
| Preceded by Paul von Legendorf | Prince-Bishop of Warmia (Ermland); 1467–1489 | Succeeded by Lucas Watzenrode |
| Preceded by Ludwig Graf von Eberstein-Naugard | Prince-Bishop of Cammin (Kamień); 1479 | Succeeded by Marinus Freganus |
