= Second Peace of Thorn (1466) =

Peace treaty between Poland and the Teutonic Order

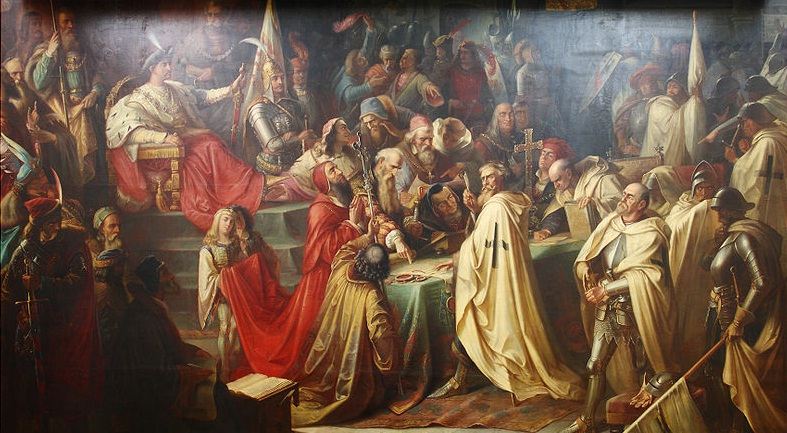
- Second Peace of Toruń, painting by M. Jaroczyński, 1873, District Museum in Toruń.
- Type: Peace treaty
- Drafted: September–October 1466
- Signed: 19 October 1466
- Location: Thorn (Toruń), Poland
- Original signatories: King Casimir IV Jagiellon; Grand Master Ludwig von Erlichshausen
- Parties: Kingdom of Poland State of the Teutonic Order
- Languages: Latin

The Peace of Thorn or Toruń of 1466, also known as the Second Peace of Thorn or Toruń (German: Zweiter Friede von Thorn; Polish: drugi pokój toruński), was a peace treaty signed in the Hanseatic city of Thorn (Toruń) on 19 October 1466 between the Polish king Casimir IV Jagiellon and the Teutonic Knights, which ended the Thirteen Years' War, the longest of the Polish–Teutonic Wars.

The treaty was signed in the Artus Court, and afterward a mass was held in the Gothic Franciscan Church of the Assumption of the Blessed Virgin Mary to celebrate the peace treaty.

== Background ==
The treaty concluded the Thirteen Years' War which had begun in February 1454 with the revolt of the Prussian Confederation, led by the cities of Danzig (Gdańsk), Elbing (Elbląg), Kulm (Chełmno) and Toruń, as well as the Prussian gentry, against the rule of the Teutonic Knights in the Monastic State, in order to join the Kingdom of Poland. Both belligerents had exhausted their financial resources and therefore pursued a negotiated peace settlement.

Both sides agreed to seek confirmation from Pope Paul II and Holy Roman Emperor Frederick III, but the Polish side stressed (and the Teutonic side agreed) that this confirmation would not be needed for validation of the treaty. The peace talks were held in Nieszawa (present-day Mała Nieszawka) from 23 September 1466, and in the final stages moved to Toruń.

== Terms ==
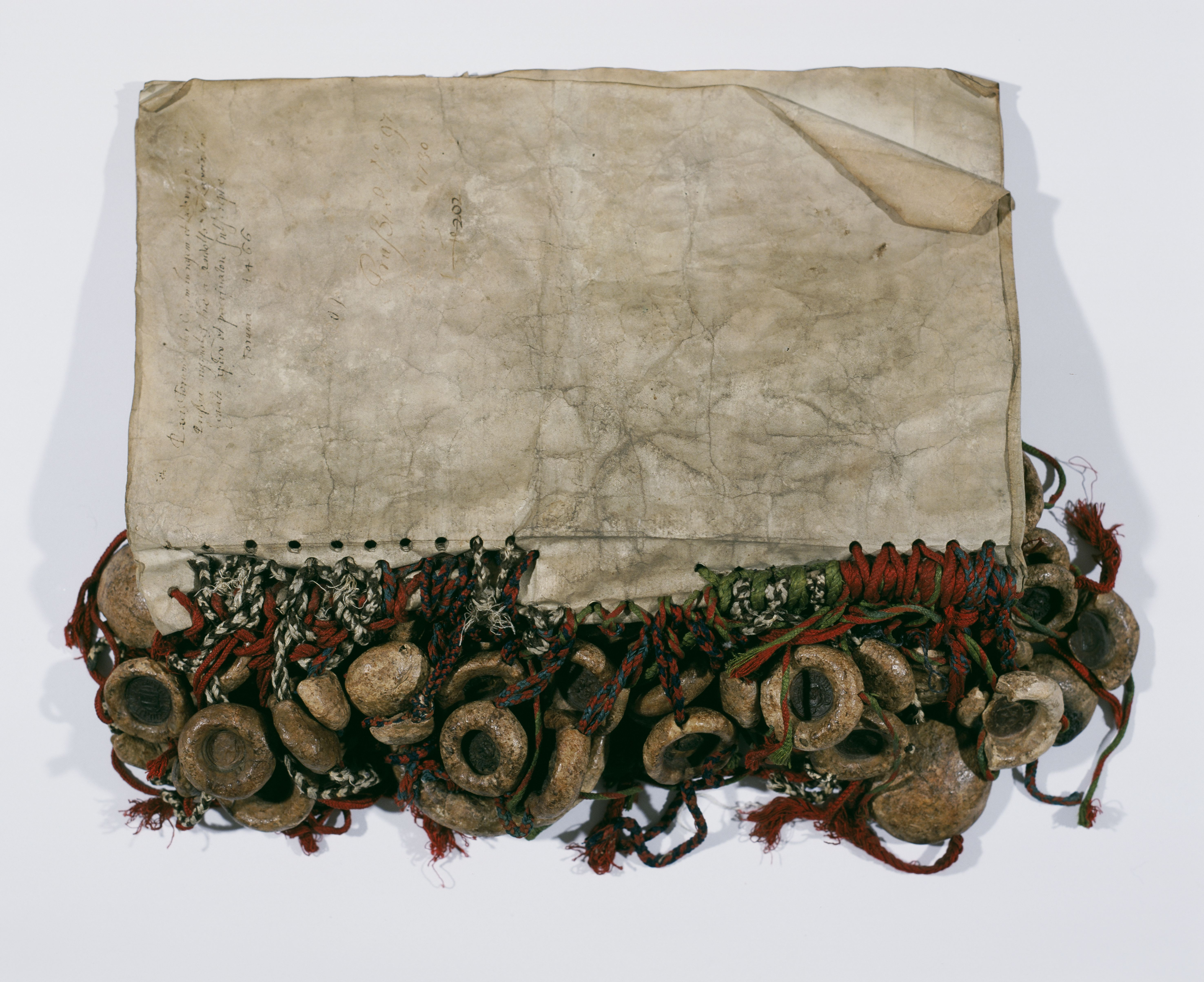
Peace treaty

In the treaty, the Teutonic Order renounced any claims to the territories of Gdańsk/Eastern Pomerania and Chełmno Land, which were reintegrated with Poland, and the region of Elbing (Elbląg) and Marienburg (Malbork), and the Bishopric of Warmia, which were also recognized as part of Poland. The eastern part remained with the Teutonic Order as a fief of the Polish Crown. The Roman Catholic Diocese of Chełmno became a suffragan of the Archdiocese of Gniezno.

From now on, every Grand Master of the Teutonic Order was obliged to swear an oath of allegiance to the reigning Polish king within six months of taking office, and any new territorial acquisitions by the Teutonic Order, also outside Prussia, would also be incorporated into Poland. The Grand Master became a prince and counselor of the Polish king and the Kingdom of Poland. Poles were to be admitted to the Teutonic Order. The Teutonic Knights were obliged to help Poland in the event of war. They were also forbidden to wage war against Catholics without the consent of Polish kings. Any prisoners of war on both sides were to be released.

The treaty also dismissed any possibility of releasing the Teutonic Order from dependence to Poland or of any revision of the terms of the treaty by referring to any foreign authority, including imperial and papal.

== Outcome ==
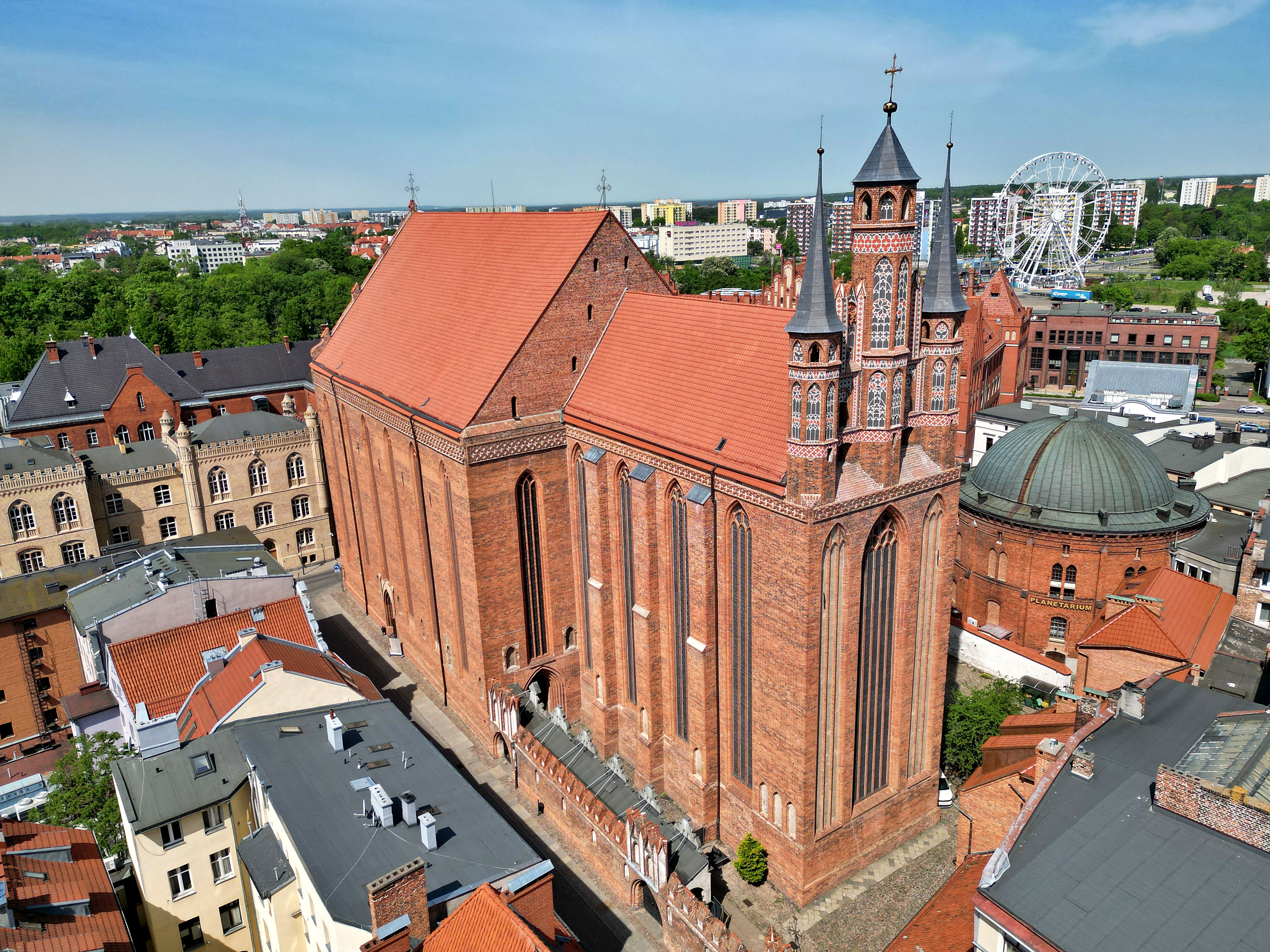
The church of the Assumption of the Blessed Virgin Mary in Toruń was the site of a celebratory mass after the signing of the peace treaty.

The territories directly held by Poland were already organized into three voivodeships (Chełmno, Pomeranian, Malbork) and the Prince-Bishopric of Warmia, all of which formed the province of Royal Prussia (later also part of the larger Greater Poland Province), which was considered the exclusive property of the Polish king and Polish kingdom. Later, some disagreements arose concerning certain prerogatives that Royal Prussia and the cities held, like Danzig's privileges. The region possessed certain privileges such as the minting of its own coins, its own Diet meetings (see the Prussian estates), its own military, and its own administrative usage of the German language. A conflict over the right to name and approve Bishops in Warmia, resulted in the War of the Priests (1467–1479). Eventually, Royal Prussia became integrated into the Polish–Lithuanian Commonwealth, but retained some distinctive features until the partitions of Poland in the late 18th century.

In 1525, the Order was ousted from their territory by its own Grand Master, Albert Hohenzollern, who adopted Lutheranism and assumed the title of duke as hereditary ruler under the overlordship of Poland in the Prussian Homage. The area became known as the Duchy of Prussia.

== See also ==
- Peace of Thorn (1411)
- List of treaties
