= Von Erlichshausen =

Von Erlichshausen is a surname. Notable people with the surname include:

- Ludwig von Erlichshausen (1410–1467), the 31st Grand Master of the Teutonic Knights
- Konrad von Erlichshausen (1390/1395–1449), the 30th Grand Master of the Teutonic Knights
