= Battle of Vistula Lagoon =

Naval battle of the Thirteen Years' War

Coordinates: 54°27′N 19°45′E

- Part of the Thirteen Years' War
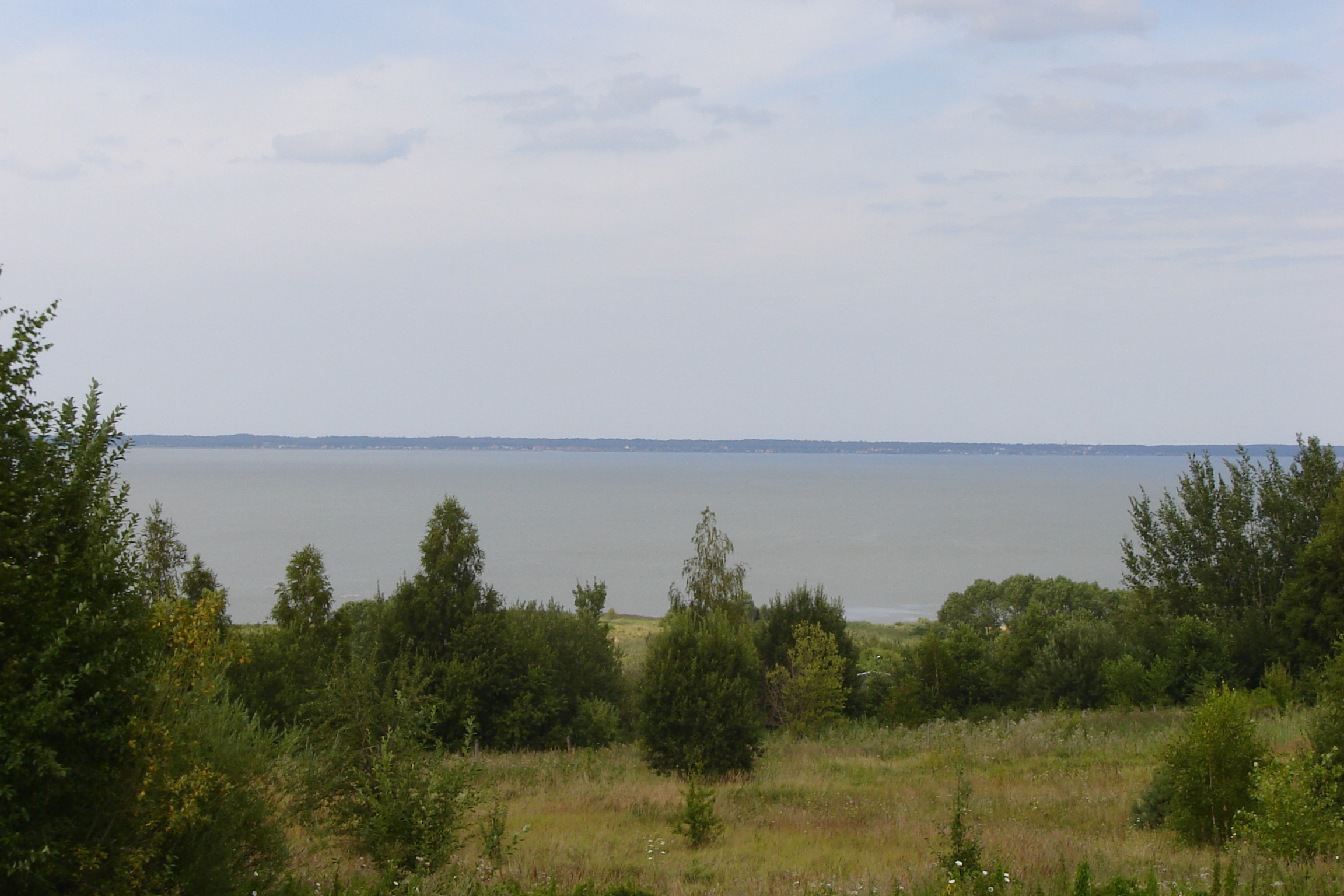
- Vistula Lagoon, the site of the battle, as pictured in 2009
Date	September 15, 1463
Location	Vistula Lagoon, Poland
Result	Polish-Prussian victory

Belligerents
Polish Crown; Prussian Confederation	Teutonic Order

Commanders and leaders
Vincent Stolle; Matthew Kolmener; Jacob Vochs	Ludwig Erlichshausen; Bernard Szumborski

Strength
30 ships	44 ships

Casualties and losses
Light	200 killed and wounded 550 captured 44 ships sunk or captured

The Battle of Vistula Lagoon (Polish: Bitwa na Zalewie Wiślanym or Polish: Bitwa w Zatoce Świeżej) was fought on September 15, 1463 between the navy of the Teutonic Order, and the navy of the Prussian Confederation which was allied with the King of Poland, as part of the Thirteen Years' War. The battle was the largest naval battle of the war, and one of the two battles (along with Battle of Świecino) which decided the final outcome of the war.

== Background ==
The Grand Master of the Teutonic Order, Ludwig von Erlichshausen, led the Teutonic fleet, in an attempt to come to the aid of the city of Mewe ("Gniew") via the Vistula River, which had been besieged by Polish forces since July, 1463. The Teutonic knights assembled 44 ships, mostly fishing boats, along with several galleys, staffed by 2500 men, of which around 1500 were armed.

== Battle ==
The Prussian ships were led by privateers Vincent Stolle and Matthew Kolmener, of Danzig (now Gdańsk); and Jacob Vochs of Elbing (now Elbląg); with support from troops of the Polish king, Casimir IV Jagiellon. Initially the Danzig sailors, facing the incoming Teutonic flotilla alone, had only ten "szniks" (light sail boats common in the Baltic in the 15th century) which were staffed with five hundred men armed with crossbows and arquebuses. To delay the enemy, they sank a galley at a narrow part of the Vistula, which blocked the entrance from the lagoon to the river. Coming upon the obstacle, von Erlichshausen stalled long enough for the Elbing ships to join up with those of Danzig. Together, the two cities had around 30 ships of various types, 600 to 700 armed men, and a similar number of sailors manning the ships themselves. Von Erlichshausen ordered a withdrawal into the lagoon where his ships bunched up close to the shore. The cities' ships on the other hand, came out of the river into the lagoon and formed themselves into a crescent formation.

Despite having fewer ships, the Prussians (as more experienced sailors) were victorious. They gained control of the Vistula. Among the captured knights was Hans Hetzel, the komtur of Memel (Klaipėda).

== Aftermath ==
As a result of the battle, Mewe capitulated to Polish forces in 1464, and the Teutonic navy was eliminated as a viable force. A number of mercenaries in the Order's service, including Bernard Szumborski, left the Teutonic side and signed an independent peace treaty with the Polish king, and the Poles and the Prussian Confederation seized the initiative in the Thirteen Years' War. The war itself ended with the signing of the Second Peace of Toruń in 1466 and the incorporation of Royal Prussia, including Gdańsk and Elbląg, into Poland.

== In chronicles and literature ==
The battle was first described by the contemporary Polish chronicler Jan Długosz. The battle is described in several works of historical fiction, among them Znak Salamandry ("Sign of the Salamander") by Jerzy Piechowski, Skruszona Potęga ("A Crumbled Power") by Kazimierz Traciewicz and Bałtyckie Orły ("Eagles of the Baltic") by Józef Wójcicki.
