= Achinger coat of arms =

Polish coat of arms

Achinger
- Alternative names: Aichinger, Ajchinger, Ajchigier, Bażyński, Kieystucz, Wiewiórka
- Earliest mention: 15th century
- Families: 16 names Achinger, Adamski, Affanasowicz or Affanowicz, Aychingerski, Barwiński, Bażyński, Berwiński, Ichnatowicz, Ichnatowski, Ihnatowicz, Ihnatowski, Jagowd(owicz), Leszniewski, Pilchowski, Rycze(o)wski, Ryszewski.

Achinger is a Polish coat of arms. It was used by several szlachta families in the times of the Kingdom of Poland and the Polish–Lithuanian Commonwealth.

== Notable bearers ==
Among the notable bearers was szlachcic Augustyn Aichinger originally from Nuremberg, business partner of Konstanty Korniakt (1520–1603) who made his fortune in international trade and became financial advisor to moldavian hospodar Alexandru Lăpușneanu. Aichinger was active in Wallachia, where he served also as Korniakt's business contact. Their immensely profitable deals under the reign of King Sigismund II Augustus covered most of Central and Eastern Europe from Turkey to Germany, based on large-scale trade in Greek wines, cotton, honey, skins and furs.

Other:

- Ajchingier family, Polish-German nobles
- Bażyński family (Baysen), Polish-German nobles
  - Jan Bażyński, first Polish governor of Royal Prussia
  - Gabriel Bażyński, Voivode of Chelmno

== Gallery ==
Achinger variation

Achinger II

Achinger III

Łyśniewski, a variation of Achinger according to Pragart

Łyśniewski I (a)

Łyśniewski II

Bartsch I, probably a variation of the Achinger

Bartsch II

== See also ==
- Polish heraldry
- Heraldic family
- List of Polish nobility coats of arms

== Bibliography ==
- Kasper Niesiecki: Herbarz Polski (Polish Armorial), Lwów, 1738
- Tadeusz Gajl: Herbarz polski od średniowiecza do XX wieku : ponad 4500 herbów szlacheckich 37 tysięcy nazwisk 55 tysięcy rodów. L&L, 2007. ISBN 978-83-60597-10-1.
- Józef Szymański: Herbarz rycerstwa polskiego z XVI wieku. Warsaw: DiG, 2001, p. 7. ISBN 83-7181-217-5.
