= Prussian Union =

The Prussian Union may refer to:

- The Prussian Confederation, a league of cities formed in 1440 to resist taxes levied by the Teutonic Order
- The Prussian Union of churches, a merger of Prussia's Lutheran and Reformed churches announced in 1817
