= Kornevo, Kaliningrad Oblast =

Settlement in Kaliningrad Oblast

Kornevo Корнево
- Rural locality
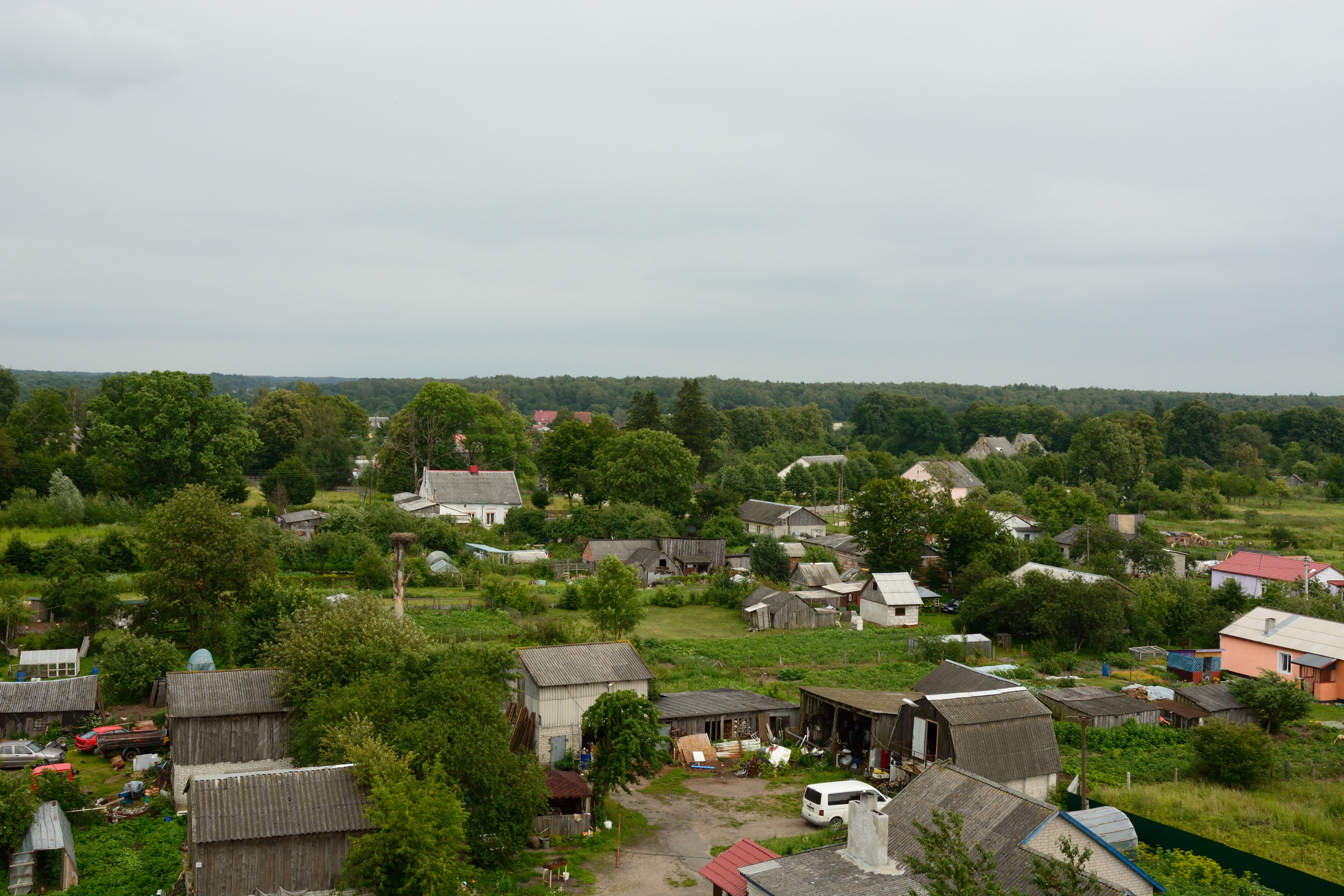

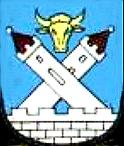
- Coat of arms
- Interactive map of Kornevo
- Location of Kornevo Kornevo (European Russia) Kornevo (Russia)
- Coordinates: 54°27′N 20°17′E
- Country: Russia
- Federal subject: Kaliningrad Oblast
- Town rights: 1313

Population
  - Estimate (2010): 1,912 )
- Time zone: UTC+2 (MSK–1)
- Postal codes: 238443, 238420
- OKTMO ID: 27703000441

Kornevo (Russian: Корнево; Polish: Cynty; German: Zinten) is a rural locality in the Bagrationovsky District of Kaliningrad Oblast, Russia, close to the border with Poland. It has a population of 1,912 (2010 census); 1,870 (2002 census); 3,488 (1905).

== History ==
The settlement was granted town rights in 1313. In 1440, the town was a founding member of the Prussian Confederation, which opposed Teutonic rule, upon the request of which King Casimir IV Jagiellon incorporated the territory into the Kingdom of Poland in 1454. After the subsequent Thirteen Years' War (1454–1466), it became a part of Poland as a fief held by the Teutonic Knights. A post of a Polish translator was established in 1543 for the Polish villagers, and there was a Polish cemetery in the town. From the 18th century, it formed part of the Kingdom of Prussia, and from 1871 to 1945 it was also part of Germany. The first Jews settled in the town in 1810, and by 1880 the Jewish community grew to 80. Later on, many left the town with only four families remaining in 1937, and the synagogue was sold by the community that same year. Town rights were revoked following World War II.
