= Treaties of Cölln and Mewe =

Treaties that transferred Neumark from the Teutonic Order to Brandenburg

The Treaties of Cölln and Mewe, concluded in 1454 and 1455, transferred the Neumark (New March) from the State of the Teutonic Order to the Electorate of Brandenburg. The Teutonic Knights had received the area as a pawn from Brandenburg in 1402, and as a possession in 1429. Financial shortages due to the onset of the Thirteen Years' War (1454–1466) forced Ludwig von Erlichshausen, Grand Master of the Teutonic Order, to pawn the Neumark to Frederick II, Elector of Brandenburg, by the Treaty of Cölln on 22 February 1454, and to subsequently sell it by the Treaty of Mewe on 16 September 1455.

== Background ==
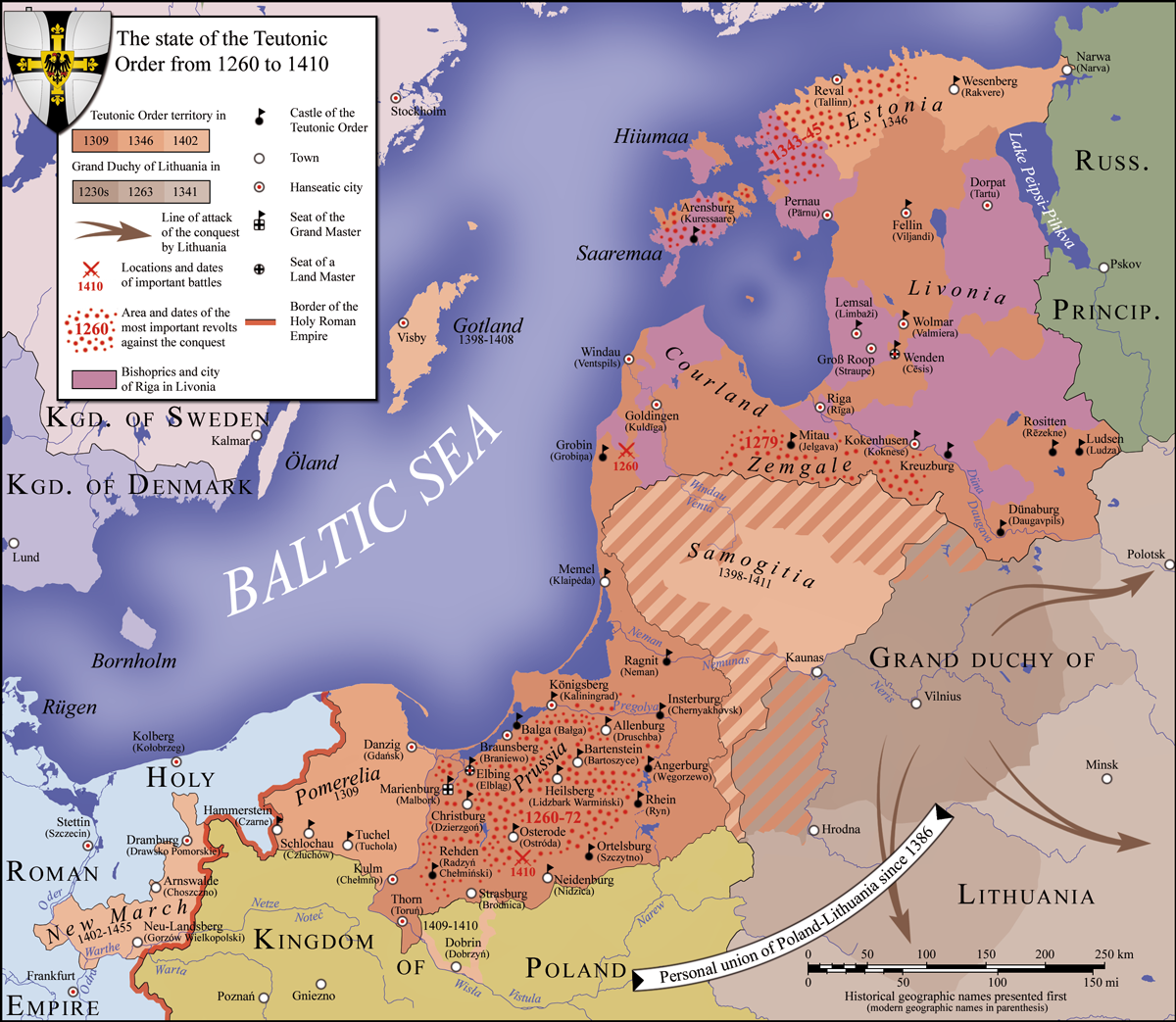
Neumark (New March) as the westernmost part of the Teutonic Order State

In the second half of the 13th century, the Margraviate of Brandenburg had established the Neumark along the lower Warthe (Warta) river. In 1374/1388, the Lords of Wedel transferred their rights on territories around Schivelbein and Falkenburg to the Teutonic Order state, their eastern neighbor.

On September 29, 1402, Sigismund of Luxembourg, King of Hungary and Margrave of Brandenburg, who inherited Neumark after the death of his brother John of Görlitz in 1396, pawned the whole of the Neumark to the Teutonic Order. After the First Peace of Thorn (1411), Grand Master (Hochmeister) Heinrich von Plauen intended to pawn the Neumark to the Polish king, and prepared a respective treaty. The noble estates of the Neumark however, on the basis of their privileges, prevented the ratification of the treaty.

On September 8, 1429, the Teutonic Order acquired the pawn as a full possession from Sigismund of Luxembourg. In February 1454, the Order was at the verge of the Thirteen Years' War following a rebellion of the Prussian Confederation, who was allied with the Kingdom of Poland. The Order's military and financial weakness resulted in an urgent need for money to attract and pay mercenaries. To that end, the Grand Master Ludwig von Erlichshausen pawned the Neumark to Brandenburg and many of his Prussian holdings to mercenary groups in 1454.

== Treaties ==
On 22 February 1454, a treaty was concluded in Cölln (now part of Berlin) between elector Frederick II of Brandenburg and the Landvogt (Landkomtur) Friedrich von Polenz (Polentz) in the name of Grand Master, wherein the Neumark was pawned to Brandenburg for 40,000 Rhenish guilders. On 6 March, Frederick II arrived at Landsberg an der Warthe to receive the homage of the estates. The nobles accepted the treaty on 31 March. The Polish king Casimir IV Jagiellon had also announced an interest in receiving the Neumark and upon hearing of the Teutonic offer to Brandenburg, entered negotiations with the Neumark nobles. Yet the estates and the Grand Master had favoured the Elector of Brandenburg.

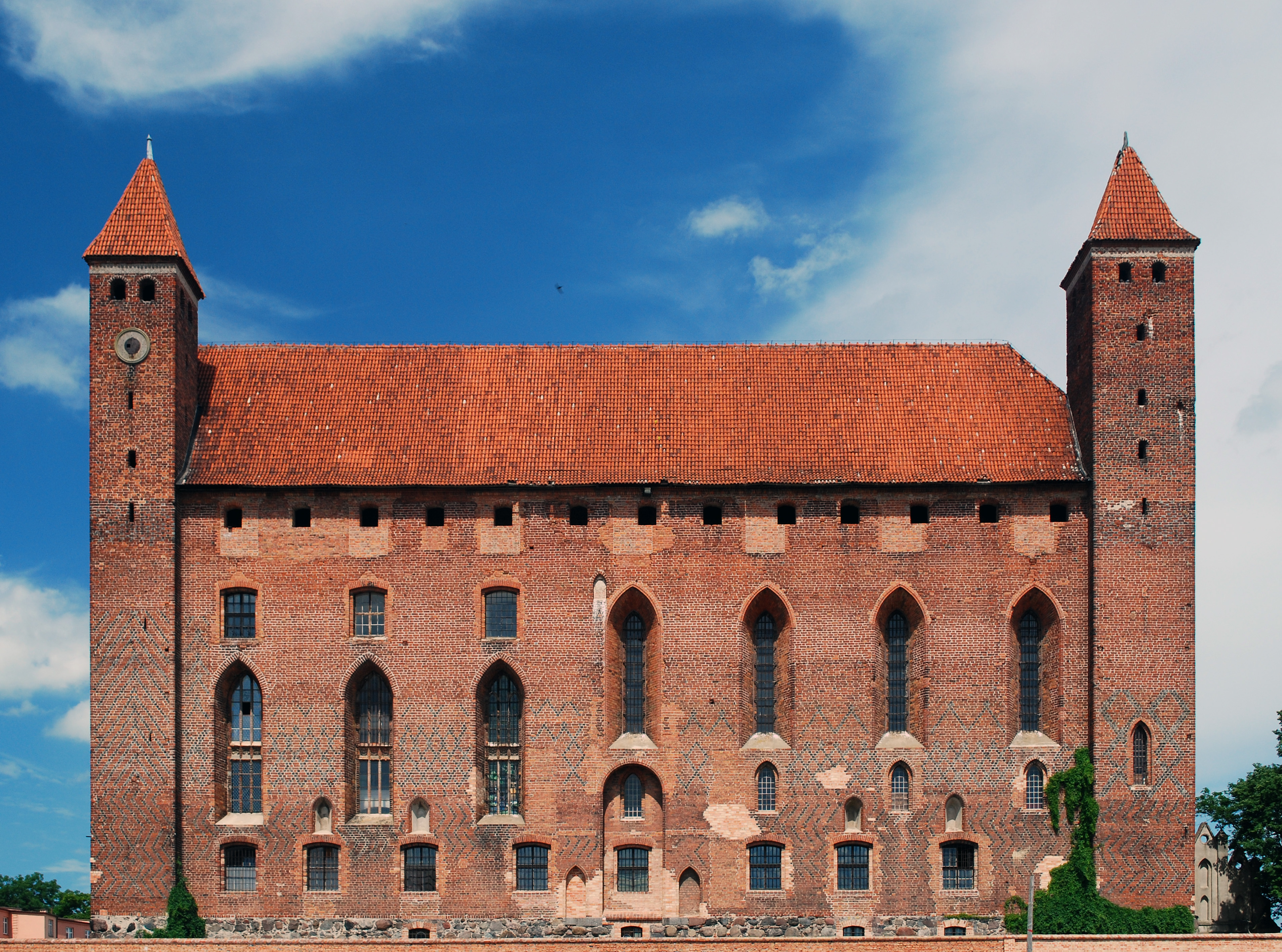
Teutonic Order's castle in Mewe (Gniew)

In June, the noble estates of the Schivelbein area approached the Brandenburgian elector for protection against frequent Polish and Pomeranian raids. They argued that because of the Teutonic Order's crisis the vogt of the Neumark was unable to keep a sufficient number of men in arms. During the following year, Frederick II continued his efforts to permanently re-gain the Neumark for Brandenburg. Without success, he held talks with the Polish king in Bromberg (Bydgoszcz) about a peace between Poland and the Order. The latter had not handed over the Schivelbein and Driesen areas with the rest of the Neumark after the Cölln treaty to pressure Frederick II to assist it in the war, also had the Holy Roman Emperor asked Frederick to mediate in the dispute. On 7 April 1455, Frederick II received the hommage of the estates and asserted their privileges.

On 16 September 1455, another treaty was concluded at the Order's castle in Mewe between Frederick II and Ludwig von Erlichshausen, wherein the Neumark was sold to Frederick for 100,000 Rhenish guilder. The Schivelbein and Driesen areas were explicitly included. The payment of 40,000 guilder resulting from the treaty of Cölln was included in the sum agreed on in Mewe. The Order was granted the right to buy the Neumark back after Frederick II's death. Brandenburg further granted the Order's forces safe conduct.

== Aftermath ==
When by the Second Peace of Thorn (1466) the Teutonic Order State lost several territories to Poland, Frederick II was concerned that a Polish king might in place of the Order claim the right to buy the Neumark according to the Mewe treaty. He wrote down a respective memorandum, directed at his successors, wherein the latter were urged to not accept such claims, keep the Neumark within the "German lands and the Holy Roman Empire and the worthy Electorate Mark of Brandenburg" and not have it "brought to non-German tongue".

In 1517, Joachim I, Elector of Brandenburg and Albert (Albrecht), Grand Master of the Teutonic Knights, agreed in Berlin that the Order relinquished its right to purchase back the Neumark from Brandenburg, in turn, Joachim I obliged himself to aid Albert with 500 horse and 600 foot in the expected war with Poland-Lithuania.

== Sources ==
Bibliography

- Amts-Blatt der Königl. Preuß. Regierung zu Frankfurt a.O., Nr. 51, 1865.
- Böckler, Heidelore (1995). "Die Festigung der Landesherrschaft durch die hohenzollernschen Kurfürsten und der Ausbau der Mark zum fürstlichen Territorialstaat während des 15. Jahrhunderts". In Materna, Ingo; et al. (eds.). Brandenburgische Geschichte (in German). Akademie Verlag. pp. 169–230. ISBN 3-05-002508-5.
- Boockmann, Hartmut, ed. (1998). Ostpreußen und Westpreußen. Deutsche Geschichte im Osten Europas (in German). Vol. 1. Siedler. ISBN 3-88680-212-4.
- Gahlbeck, Christian (2007). Archivführer zur Geschichte Ostbrandenburgs bis 1945. Schriften des Bundesinstituts für Kultur und Geschichte der Deutschen im östlichen Europa (in German). Vol. 31. Oldenbourg Wissenschaftsverlag. ISBN 978-3-486-58252-9.
- Gallus, Gottfried Traugott (1798). Geschichte der Mark Brandenburg für Freunde historischer Kunde (in German). Vol. 2.
- Heinrich, Gerd (1992). "Die 'Freien Herren' und das Land. Markgrafenherrschaft und landständliche Einflußnahme im Brandenburg des Spätmittelalters". In Boockmann, Hartmut (ed.). Die Anfänge der ständischen Vertretungen in Preußen und seinen Nachbarländern. Schriften des Historischen Kollegs (in German). Vol. 16. Oldenbourg Wissenschaftsverlag. ISBN 3-486-55840-4.
- Hirsch, Theodor (1878). "Friedrich II., Kurfürst und Markgraf von Brandenburg". ADB (Onlinefassung). Allgemeine Deutsche Biographie (in German). Vol. 7. pp. 475–480.
- Joachim, Erich; Hubatsch, Walter (1973): Regesta historica-diplomatica Ordinis S. Mariae Theutonicorum, 1198-1525, Teil 1, Band 1, p. 840: Verpfändung der Neumark an den Markgrafen von Brandenburg und dessen Hilfe für den Orden, Arnswalde, 13 June 1454. Anlage: Urkunde des Landkomturs Friedrich von Polentz über die Verpfändung der Neumark, 22 February 1454, Abschrift. Listed as PrUB JH I 12913 in Sarnowsky, Jürgen (1999-2009): Das virtuelle Preußische Urkundenbuch. Regesten und Texte zur Geschichte Preußens und des Deutschen Ordens. Retrieved on 8 July 2010.
- Neugebauer, Wolfgang (1996). Die Hohenzollern. Anfänge, Landesstaat und monarchistische Autokratie bis 1740 (in German). Vol. 1. Kohlhammer. ISBN 3-17-012096-4.
- Sach, Maike (2002). Hochmeister und Grossfürst. Die Beziehungen zwischen dem Deutschen Orden in Preußen und dem Moskauer Staat um die Wende zur Neuzeit. Quellen und Studien zur Geschichte des östlichen Europa (in German). Vol. 62. Franz Steiner Verlag. ISBN 3-515-08047-3.
- Schultze, Johannes (1989). Die Mark Brandenburg (in German) (2 ed.). Duncker&Humblot. ISBN 3-428-01376-X.
- Sonthofen, Wolfgang (1990). Der Deutsche Orden. 800 Jahre Geschichte (in German). Rombach. ISBN 3-7930-0588-7.
- Voigt, Friedrich (1860). Geschichte des brandenburgisch-preußischen Staates (in German). Dümmler.
- Ortvay, Theodor (1892). Geschichte der Stadt Pressburg (in German). Stampfel.
