= Jan Bażyński =

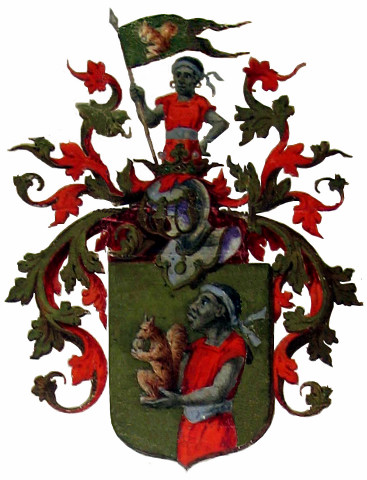
Baysen coat of arms

Hans von Baysen or Jan Bażyński (c. 1394 – 1459) was a Prussian knight and statesman, leader of the Prussian Confederation and the first Polish governor of Royal Prussia.

== Biography ==
The Baysen family was part of a larger Flemish family which came in the 13th century from Lübeck or its vicinity. They named themselves after their possession, Basien (Bażyny) near Wormditt (Orneta) in Ermland (Warmia).

Initially, he was employed by the Teutonic Knights and their Grand Masters, among them Konrad von Erlichshausen and Ludwig von Erlichshausen. He was one of the order's native lay associates.

In service of the Grand Masters, Jan traveled on diplomatic missions to England, Denmark and Portugal in the years 1419–1422. According to legend he was knighted by the King of Portugal for his military service against the Moors during the Reconquista, which was reflected in a modification to his family's coat of arms. After Michael Küchmeister resigned as head of the order, Bażyński also terminated his service with the knights. He was also one of the ambassadors of Grandmaster Paul von Rusdorf, who appointed him to a member of a secret council.

He was a leader of the gathering of Prussian nobility in 1435 which was dissastified with the rule of the Teutonic Knights. He was also a member of the Lizard Union, an organization of Prussian nobles and knights who sought the incorporation of Prussia into the Kingdom of Poland. As the Standard-bearer of Ostróda (Osterode) he took part in the founding of the Prussian Confederation, and was one of the signatories of the founding document of the Confederation on March 14, 1440, in Kwidzyn (Marienwerder). He was a member of the Secret Committee of the Confederation and took a public stance against attacks made against the organization by the papal legate and the new Grand Master of the Order.

He was the head of the delegation which came from Toruń (Thorn) to Kraków in February 1454, which asked the King of Poland Casimir IV Jagiellon to reincorporate Prussian lands into the Polish kingdom. Consequently, he led the uprising of the Prussian Estates against the Knights. In 1454, during the Thirteen Years' War, in which the cities of the Prussian Confederation financed Polish military expenses, he was made governor of Royal Prussia by the King of Poland, which after the war became a part of the Polish–Lithuanian Commonwealth. As the governor his residence was in Elbląg. In 1457 and 1459 he commanded the defense of Malbork against attacks by the Teutonic Knights, who also unsuccessfully tried to assassinate him. In 1454 he was made the starosta of Sztum (Shtum) and in 1456 of Tolkmicko (Tolkemikt).

He died at Marienburg Castle (Malbork Castle) and was buried at Elbląg. He was succeeded as governor of Royal Prussia by his brother Ścibor Bażyński (Tiburcius/Stibor von Baysen).

== Legacy ==
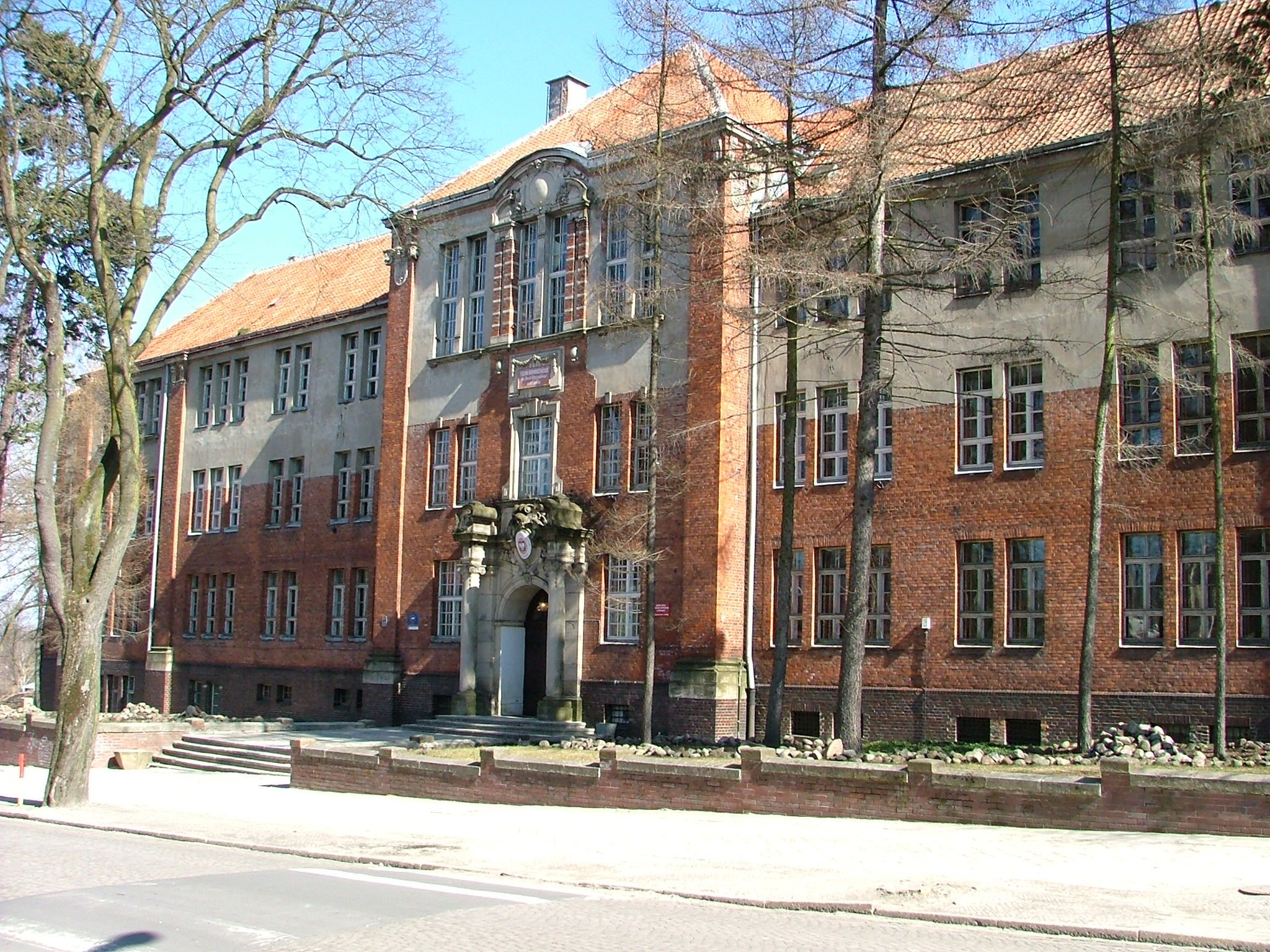
The First General Lyceum of Jan Bażyński

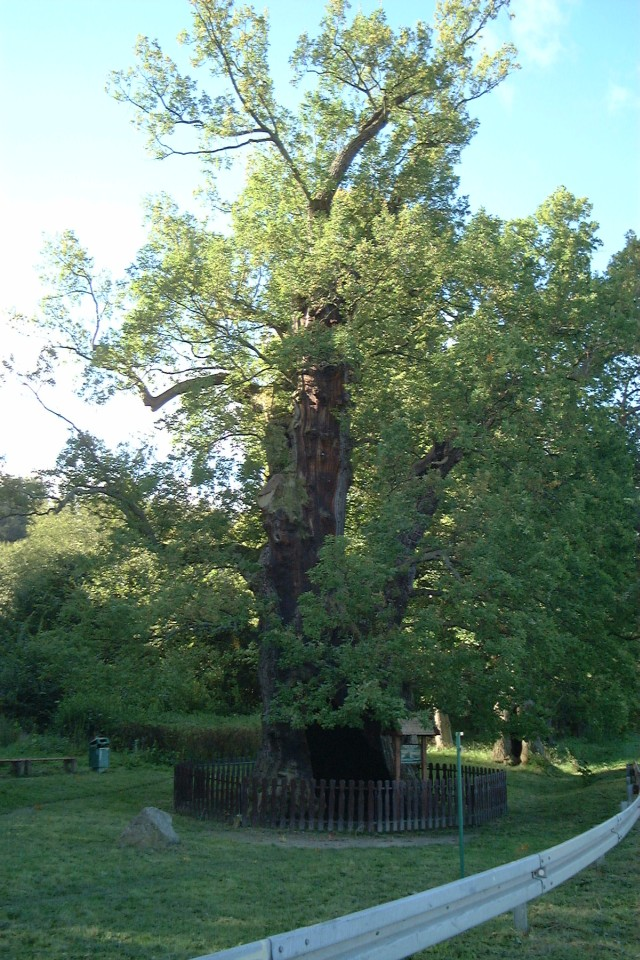
Bażyński Oak

In honour of Jan Bażyński the authorities of Ostróda named him in 1966 as the patron of the First General Lyceum in the town, thus making it The First General Lyceum of Jan Bażyński. Besides the Lyceum there is also Bażyński Oak – a 700-year-old oak located in Kadyny.
