= Prussian Confederation =

Organization of Prussian nobles in opposition to the Teutonic Order (1440-66)

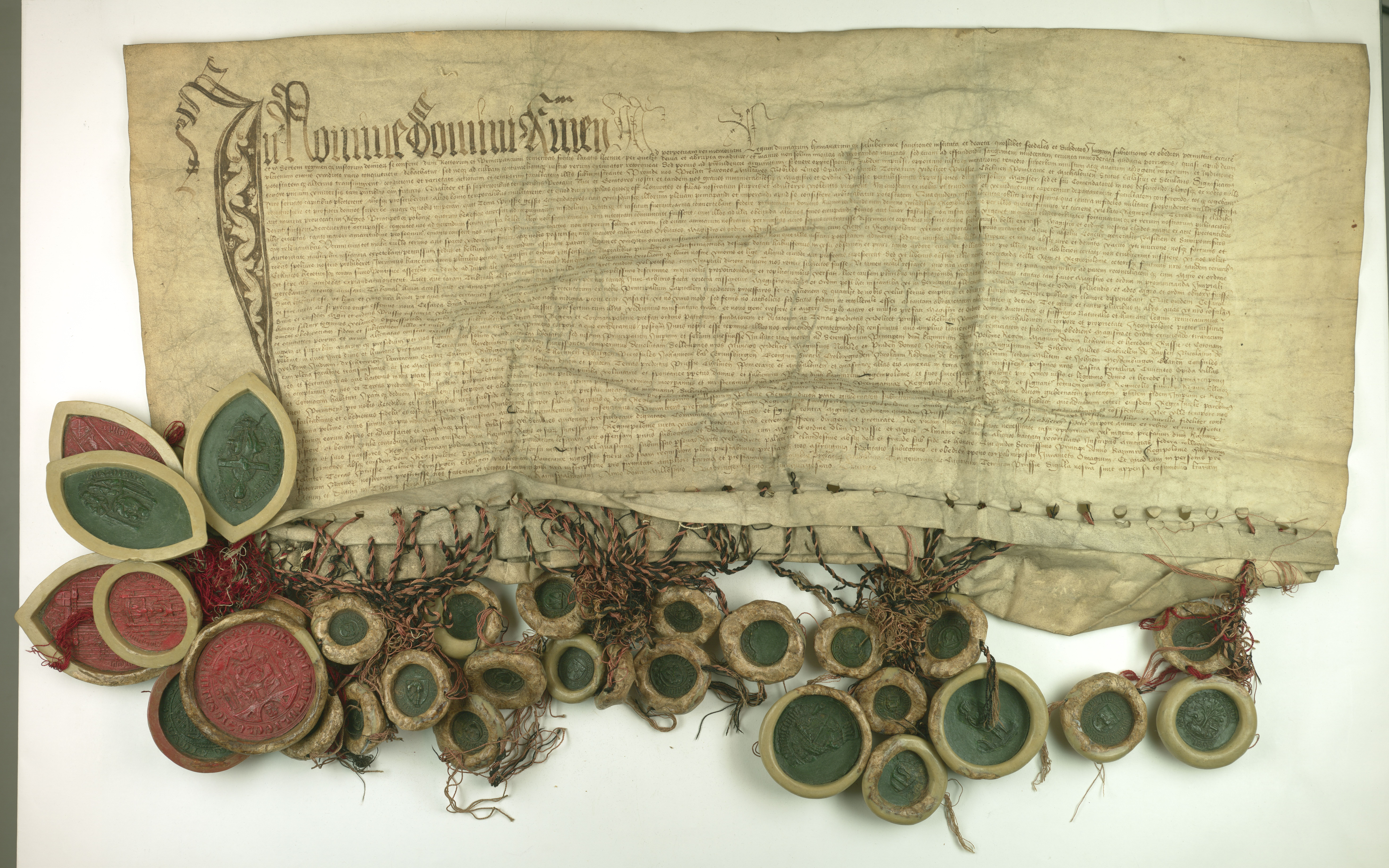
Prussian Confederation offered to incorporate Prussia into the Kingdom of Poland, 1454, Polish Central Archives of Historical Records

The Prussian Confederation (German: Preußischer Bund, Polish: Związek Pruski) was an organization formed on 21 February 1440 at Marienwerder (present-day Kwidzyn) by a group of 53 nobles and clergy and 19 cities in Prussia, to oppose the arbitrariness of the Teutonic Knights. It was based on an earlier similar organization, the Lizard Union established in 1397 by the nobles of Chełmno Land.

In 1454, the leader of the Confederation, Johannes von Baysen (Jan Bażyński), formally asked King Casimir IV Jagiellon, to incorporate Prussia into the Kingdom of Poland. This marked the beginning of the Thirteen Years' War between the Order's State and Poland, with the cities co-financing the military costs of the latter.

== Background ==
According to the 1411 First Peace of Thorn, which followed the Teutonic Knights' defeat in the Battle of Grunwald, the Teutonic Order had to pay high reparations to the Kingdom of Poland. The monastic state imposed high taxes on the cities to raise the funds as well as to re-arm for another war against Poland. In the 1420s, Grand Master Paul von Rusdorf brought stability to the Order and its relations, but fighting with Poland resumed in 1431, when the Knights' invasion into Poland during the Lithuanian Civil War sparked another Polish-Teutonic conflict.

== Establishment ==
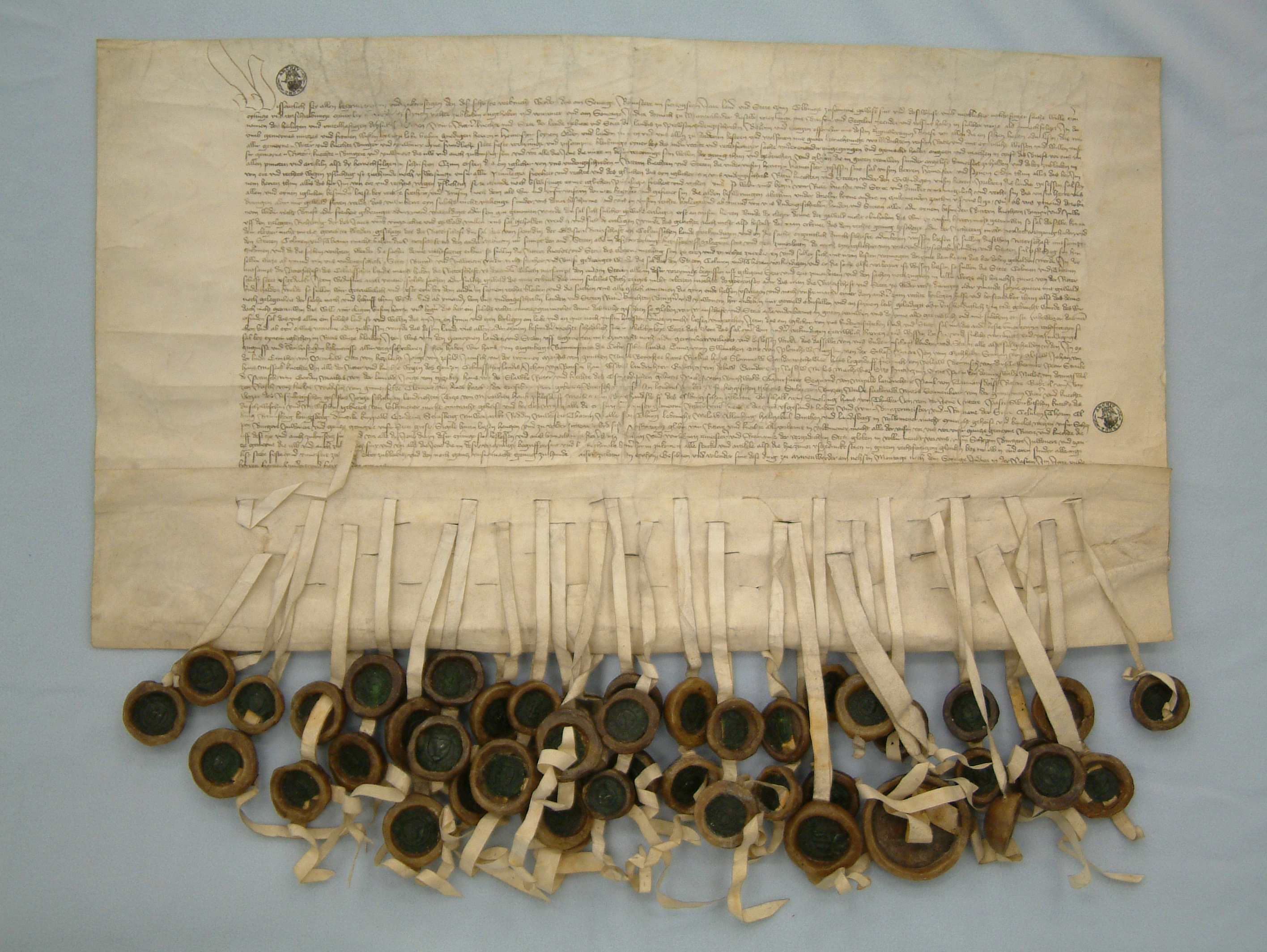
Foundation act of the Prussian Confederation from 1440

After about three decades of growing discontent, the burghers, nobility and landowners from the Teutonic state (see Prussian estates) organized themselves to oppose the rule of the order more effectively. The decision to establish the organization was made at a convention held in Elbing (Elbląg) on 21 February 1440. The convention was attended by representatives of the cities of Kulm (Chełmno), Elbing, Thorn (Toruń), Danzig (Gdańsk), Braunsberg (Braniewo), Königsberg (Królewiec), and Kneiphof (Knipawa) as well as nobles from various areas. On 14 March 1440, a group of 53 nobles and clergy and 19 cities, under the leadership of the Hanseatic cities of Danzig, Elbing, Thorn and Königsberg, founded the Prussian Confederation in Marienwerder (Kwidzyn). More towns joined later on (see Participating towns below). In Danzig, the new members signed a document which was kept in the archives of Thorn. The official representatives of the Confederation were the city councils of Kulm (Chełmno) and Thorn (Toruń), and the knights of Chełmno Land.

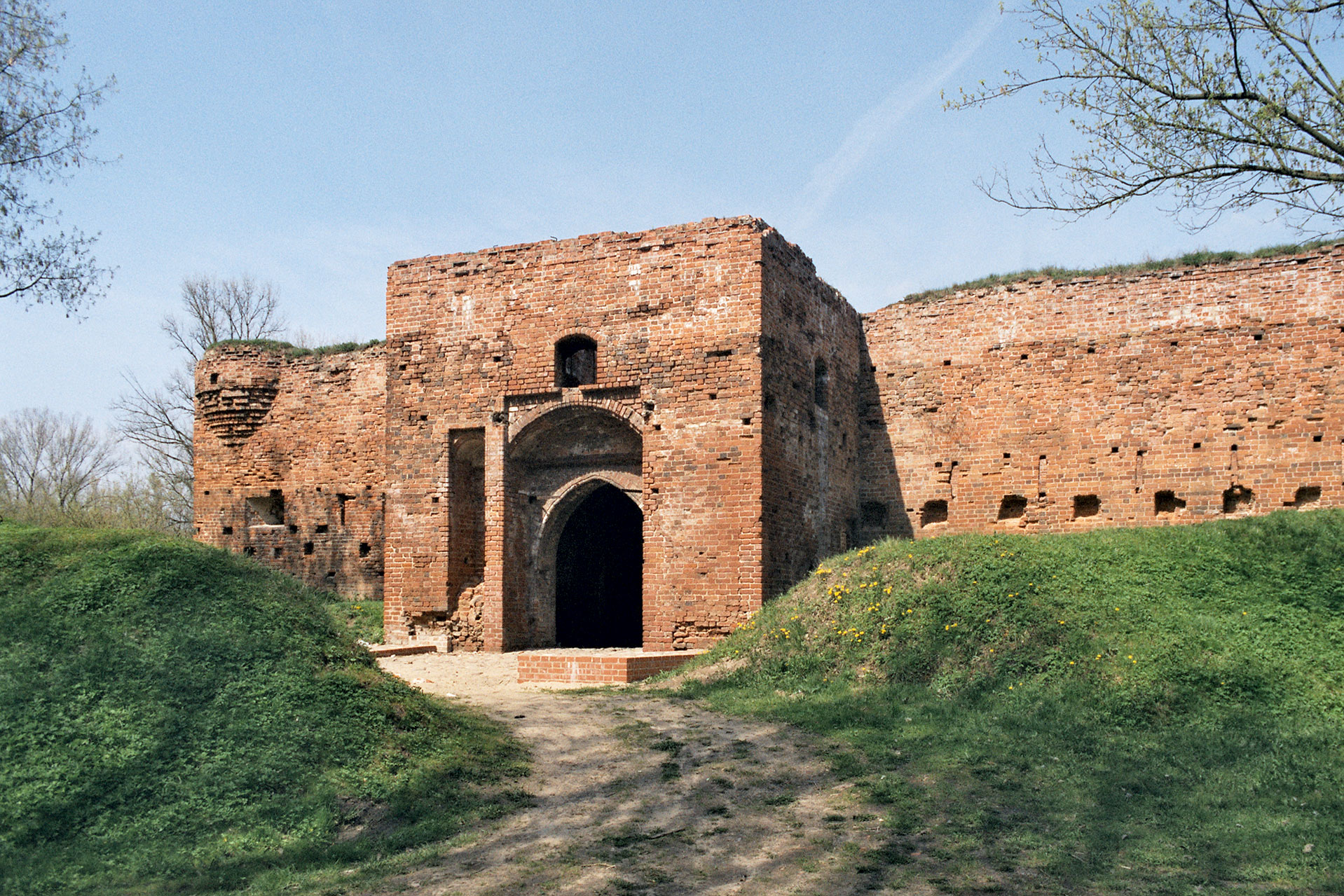
Dybów Castle, place of talks between King Casimir IV Jagiellon and the burghers of the Confederation from 1452

After Grand Master Paul von Rusdorf died in 1441, his successor, Konrad von Erlichshausen, continued to negotiate a compromise until his own death in 1449. The confederation lobbied for support against the Teutonic Order within the Holy Roman Empire. Ludwig von Erlichshausen, Grand Master from 1450 to 1467, took a more aggressive stance towards the confederation. He filed a lawsuit at the court of Emperor Frederick III. In response, the organization established a secret council to confer during the trial. The secret council held talks with Poland, and organized forces to revolt against the Teutonic Knights. The verdict of the Imperial court of 1453 declared the confederation illegal, however, the verdict was not recognized by the organization nor by Poland.

== Thirteen Years' War ==
In February 1454, the Prussian Confederation rose against the Teutonic Order's rule. Gabriel von Baysen and Johannes von Baysen, now leading the confederation with the support of Jan de Jani and Mikołaj Szarlejski, both of the Clan of Ostoja, requested the protection of King Casimir IV Jagiellon of Poland, and the incorporation of the region into the Kingdom of Poland, to which the King agreed and signed an act of incorporation in Kraków in March 1454. They also asked for, and received, a guarantee of their continued city rights and privileges for the nobility. Delegates and officials of the Confederation pledged allegiance to the Polish King during the incorporation in Kraków, and also in the following months.

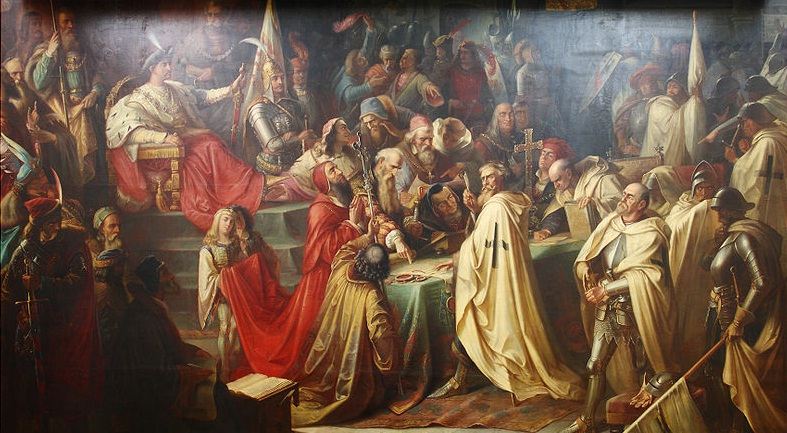
Second Peace of Toruń, 19th-century painting by Marian Jaroczyński

The resulting Thirteen Years' War ended in the defeat of the Teutonic Order and the 1466 Second Peace of Thorn. The Order renounced any claims to the territories of Gdańsk Pomerania and Chełmno Land (Kulmerland), which were reintegrated with Poland, and the region of Elbing (Elbląg) and Marienburg (Malbork), and Warmia (Ermland), which were also recognized as part of Poland. These regions formed the new Polish province of Royal Prussia, with some local rights of autonomy. Stibor of Poniec of the Clan of Ostoja become Lord of the Regality of Malbork. Much of the eastern territories, in historic Prussia, remained with the Teutonic Order, although as a fief of the Polish Crown. The Prussian Confederation, with its members now practically divided, ceased to exist as such.

== Aftermath ==
Both the Polish and Teutonic sides agreed to seek the confirmation of the Second Peace of Thorn from Emperor Frederick III and Pope Paul II, but they also agreed that this confirmation would not be needed for validation of the treaty. Soon after, however, a dispute about the status of the Prince-Bishopric of Warmia started a smaller conflict called the War of the Priests.

== Participating towns ==
Location of founding towns (red), towns that joined in 1440 (orange) and towns that joined in 1441–44 (yellow) on the modern map of Poland and the Kaliningrad Oblast of Russia

Towns which founded the Prussian Confederation on 14 March 1440:

Name
Thorn (Toruń) including "New Town"
Culm (Chełmno)
Elbing (Elbląg) including "New Town"
Danzig (Gdańsk)
Braunsberg (Braniewo)
Königsberg (Królewiec, now Kaliningrad), including Kneiphof (Knipawa) and "Old Town"
Graudenz (Grudziądz)
Strasburg (Brodnica)
Neumark (Nowe Miasto Lubawskie)
Löbau (Lubawa)
Rehden (Radzyń Chełmiński)
Wehlau (Welawa, now Znamensk)
Allenburg (Alembork, now Druzhba)
Zinten (Cynty, now Kornevo)
Heiligenbeil (Święta Siekierka, now Mamonovo)
Landsberg (Górowo Iławeckie)

Towns which joined the Prussian Confederation in 1440:

Name	Date of accession
Starogard	31 March 1440
Morąg	3 April 1440
Pasłęk	3 April 1440
Miłakowo	3 April 1440
Tolkmicko	3 April 1440
Młynary	3 April 1440
Tczew	3 April 1440
Gniew	3 April 1440
Old Town of Gdańsk	3 April 1440
Nowe	3 April 1440
Lębork	3 April 1440
Łeba	3 April 1440
Hel	3 April 1440
Puck	3 April 1440
Kwidzyn	17 April 1440
Chojnice	1 May 1440
Malbork	5 May 1440
Bartoszyce	5 May 1440
Sępopol	5 May 1440
Rastembork (Kętrzyn)	5 May 1440
Friedland (Frydląd, now Pravdinsk)	5 May 1440
Orneta	5 May 1440
Lidzbark Warmiński	5 May 1440
Reszel	5 May 1440
Dobre Miasto	5 May 1440
Wartembork (Barczewo)	5 May 1440
Jeziorany	5 May 1440
Bisztynek	5 May 1440
Olsztyn	5 May 1440
Frombork	5 May 1440
Melzak (Pieniężno)	5 May 1440
Tuchola	6 May 1440
Kreuzburg (Krzyżbork, now Slavskoye)	30 May 1440
Domnau (Domnowo, now Domnovo)	30 May 1440
Sztum	21 June 1440
Gerdauen (Gierdawy, now Zheleznodorozhny)	18 October 1440

Further towns joined in the following years, including Człuchów, Pasym, Nidzica, Działdowo, Dąbrówno, Olsztynek, Prabuty, Chełmża.

Further nobles joined following the outbreak of the Thirteen Years' War, and the towns of Dzierzgoń, Łuczany (now Giżycko) and Nowy Staw also sided with Poland in the war, and several more also recognized Polish rule and pledged allegiance to Poland, including Czarne, Debrzno, Golub, Kowalewo, Lidzbark, Łasin, Susz, Wąbrzeźno.

== Bibliography ==
- Górski, Karol (1949). Związek Pruski i poddanie się Prus Polsce: zbiór tekstów źródłowych (in Polish). Poznań: Instytut Zachodni.
