= Jan Skalski (knight) =

15th-century Bohemian military commander

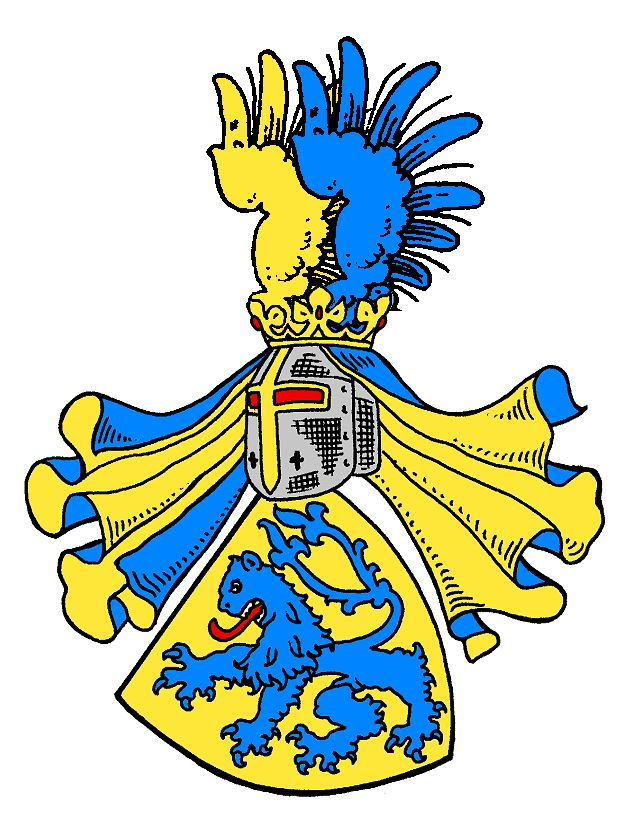
Coat of arms of the Waldestein family from the 13th century

Jan Skalski was a Bohemian military commander. During the Thirteen Years' War (1454–1466), he initially served the Teutonic Order, but in 1455, due to arrears in his pay, he transferred to the service of King Casimir Jagiellon.

== Biography ==
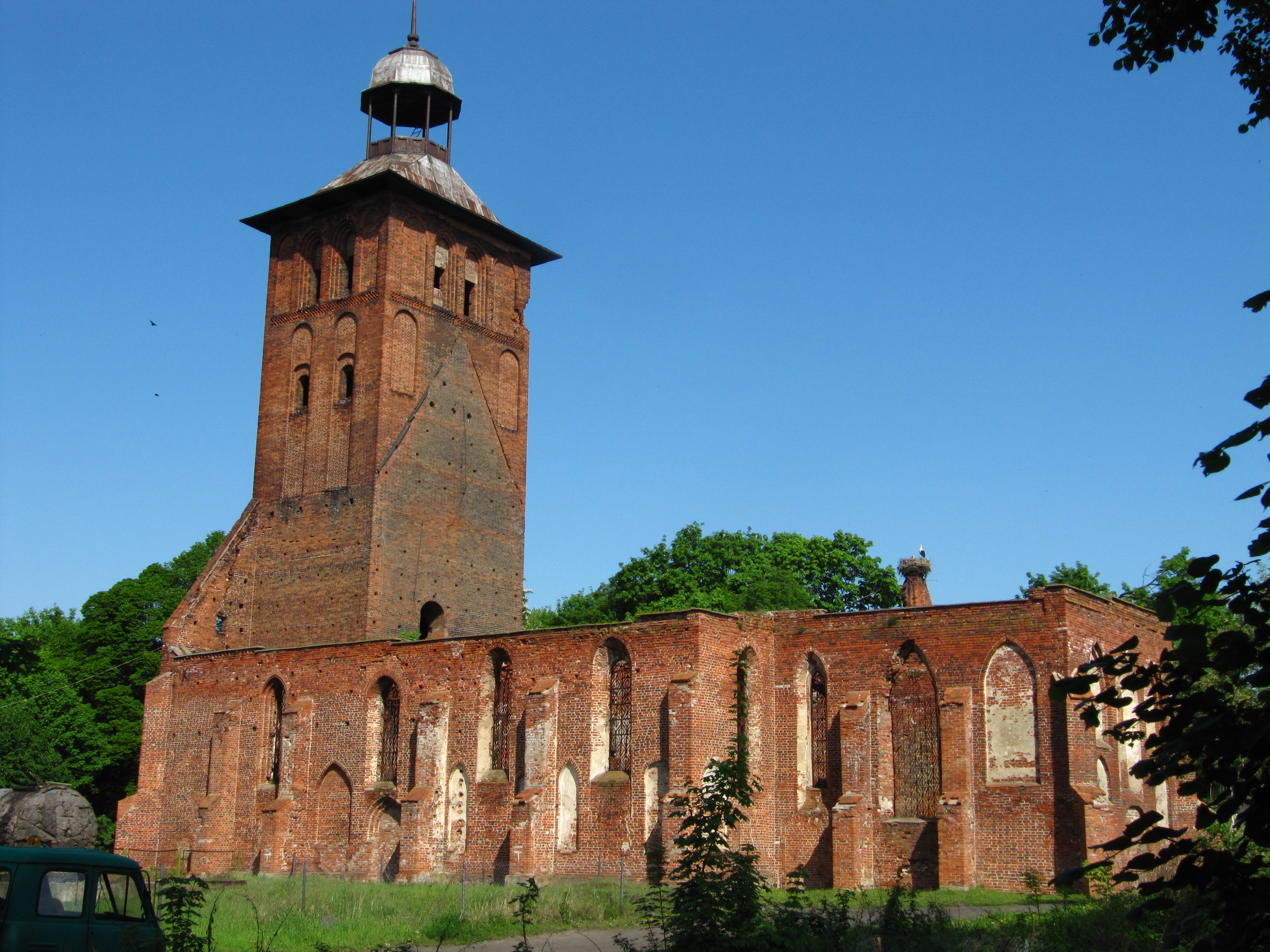
Ruins of St. Jacob's church are one of very few historic landmarks still visible in Znamensk

In 1455, due to arrears of pay, Skalski came under the command of the Polish King Casimir Jagiellon. Skalski occupied the Warmian towns of Braniewo and Frombork, and from there organised attacks on the surrounding castles and towns, using local caper ships. He successfully used the tactic of co-operation between water and land forces, participating, among others, in the siege of Welawa (1460), Sępopol (1461) and Frombork (1462). His unit was one of the most active in Prussia. However, due to tensions with the local population, the burghers of Braniewo, with the support of the Warmian bishop Paul Legendorf, attacked the Bohemian garrison and surrendered the city to the bishop. During an unsuccessful attempt to retake Braniewo in November 1461, Skalski was wounded. He continued warfare until the end of the conflict, including the defence of Orneta (1462) and the capture of Pieniężno (1466).

After the war he remained in Poland and received the castle of Grudziądz together with the starosty in return for his outstanding salary. He married Dorota from the Prussian Kletz family; their child died shortly after birth.
