= Dybów Castle =

Castle in Toruń, Poland

Coordinates: 53°00′04″N 18°36′0″E

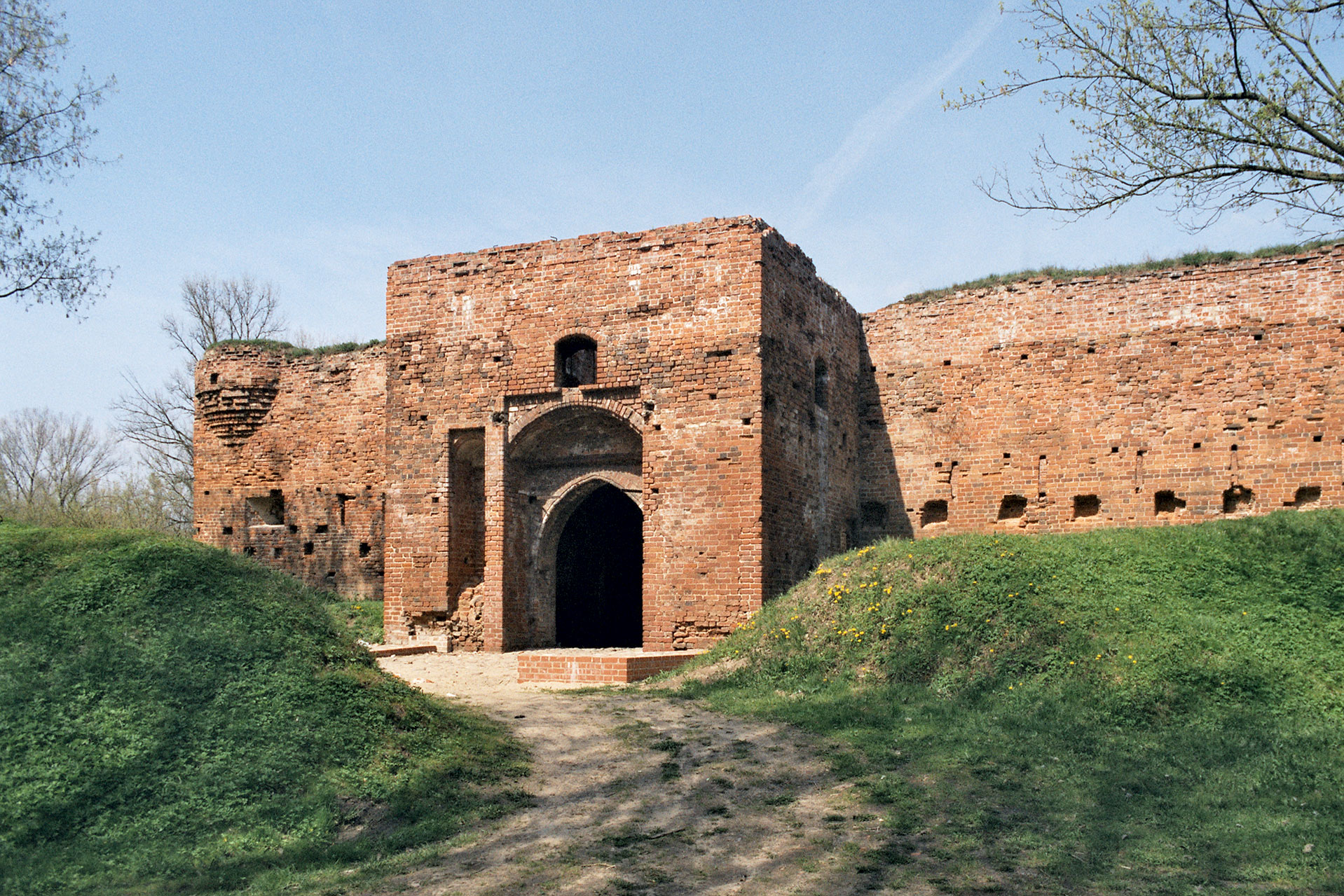
Dybów Castle

Dybów Castle (Polish: Zamek Dybów) is a castle in Toruń, Poland. It is a national Object of Cultural Heritage.

== Location ==
The castle is located in the Piaski district of Toruń, on the western side of the Vistula river.

== History ==
Built by Władysław II Jagiełło during the period between 1424 and 1428, the castle was built near the settlement of Nieszawa (known as OldNieszawa) which was destroyed during the Thirteen Years' War and relocated to its present location Nieszawa. From 1454 Dybów Castle was the seat of the king's foremans. The castle was burned down in 1656 by the Swedes during the Swedish-Polish wars. In the eighteenth century, the castle was owned by the Dębski family, and a distillery was opened. In 1813, 40 French troops occupying the castle, under the command of Lieutenant Savary, withstood a three-month siege by the Russians. The castle has survived to this day in the form of ruins, with preserved perimeter walls, and a two-story gate tower and fortifications. An excavation of the castle was carried out in 1998–2000.

== See also ==
- Castles in Poland
