= Paul von Rusdorf =

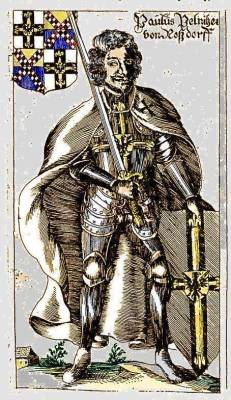

Grand Master of the Teutonic Knights
- Reign: 1422 - January 2, 1441
- Predecessor: Michael Küchmeister von Sternberg
- Successor: Konrad von Erlichshausen
- Born: Around 1385; Roisdorf, Bornheim
- Died: January 9, 1441; Malbork Castle
- Burial: St. Anne's Chapel. Malbork Castle

Paul von Rusdorf (c. 1385 – 1441) was the 29th Grand Master of the Teutonic Knights, serving from 1422 to 1441.

The Treaty of Melno was one of von Rusdorf's first acts; it brought stability to the Order and its relations, but fighting resumed in 1431 with the Polish-Teutonic War (1431-1435). Johannes von Baysen (Jan Bażyński) was one of his ambassadors.

Grand Master of the Teutonic Order
Preceded by Michael Küchmeister von Sternberg	Hochmeister; 1422–1441	Succeeded by Konrad von Erlichshausen
