= Ludwig von Erlichshausen =

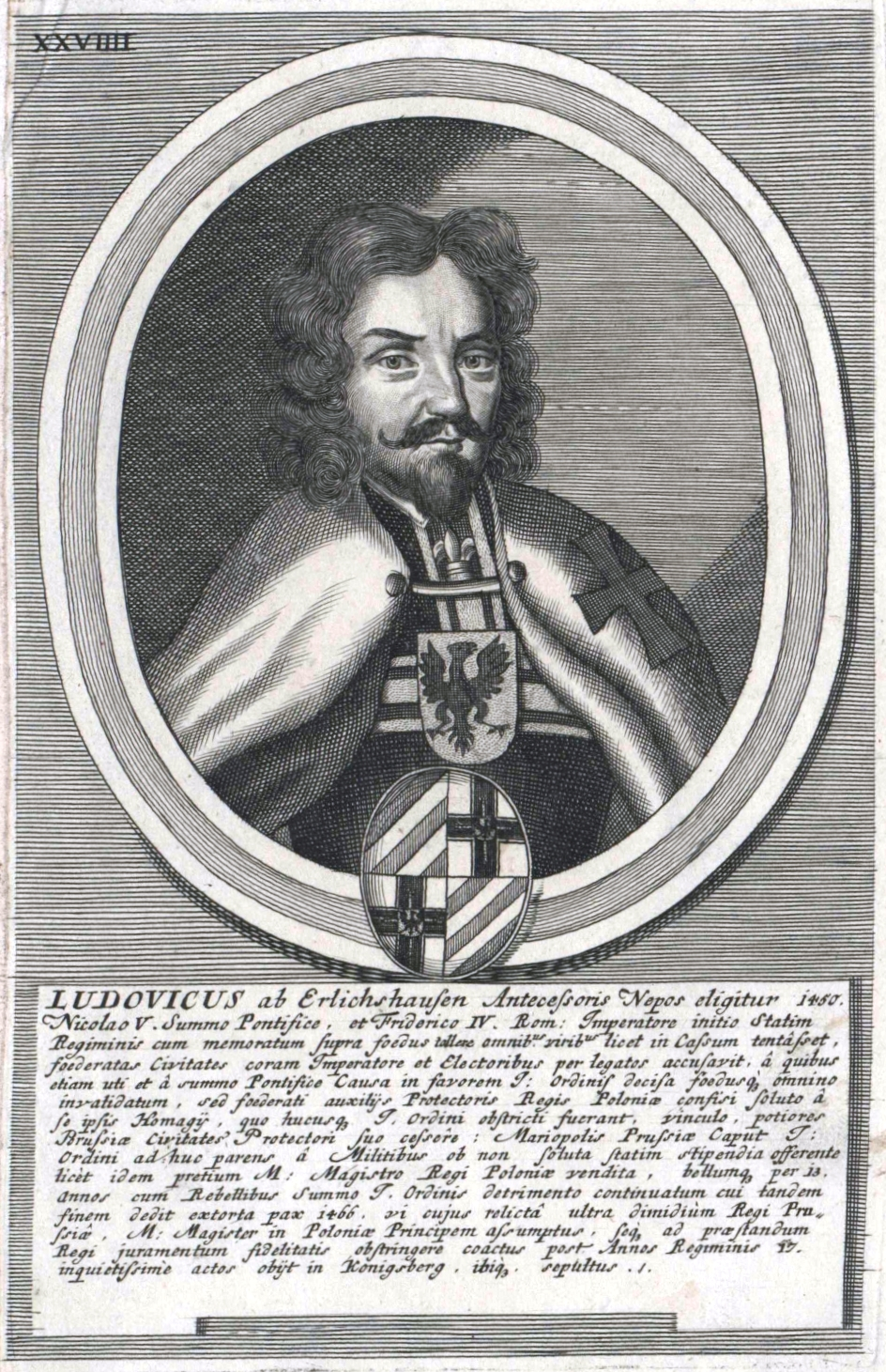

Grand Master of the Teutonic Knights
- Reign: 1449/50–1467
- Predecessor: Konrad von Erlichshausen
- Successor: Heinrich Reffle von Richtenberg
- Born: c.1410 Swabia
- Died: 4 April 1467; Königsberg, State of the Teutonic Order (now Kaliningrad, Russian Federation)
- Burial: Königsberg Cathedral
- House: House of Hohenlohe

Ludwig von Erlichshausen (1410–1467) was the 31st Grand Master of the Teutonic Knights, serving from 1449/1450 to 1467.

As did his uncle and predecessor Konrad von Erlichshausen, Ludwig came from Ellrichshausen in Swabia, now part of Satteldorf in Baden-Württemberg.

Ludwig was aide to Grand Master Paul von Rusdorf 1436-40, Komtur of Schönsee (Wąbrzeźno) near Thorn (Toruń) (1442–47), and Komtur of Mewe (Gniew) (1446–50). After the death of his more compromising uncle in 1449, Ludwig became Grand Master in 1450, despite being of limited ability and bad temper.

His uncompromising stance towards the Prussian Confederation made the Prussian cities ask the Polish king for support, which led to the outbreak of the Thirteen Years' War in 1454 between the Order and Poland, supported by the Prussian Confederation.

As the Order was short on cash since the expensive First Peace of Thorn (1411), Ludwig had to hand over the Order's headquarter Marienburg Castle in Malbork to his mercenaries in lieu of pay during the war. In turn, they sold it to the Polish king who entered the castle in June 1457. The Order had to move its capital to Königsberg. In 1454/1455, the Neumark was first pawned, then sold to the Electorate of Brandenburg by the Treaties of Cölln and Mewe.

Their former capital of Marienburg was not the only loss, however, as the Order had to cede other areas in the Second Peace of Thorn in 1466: Pomerelia, Culmerland, Warmia, and a part of Pomesania including Marienwerder (Kwidzyn).

Ludwig died at Königsberg.

Grand Master of the Teutonic Order
| Preceded by Konrad von Erlichshausen | Hochmeister; 1449 or 1450–1467 | Succeeded by Heinrich Reuß von Plauen |
