= Konrad von Erlichshausen =

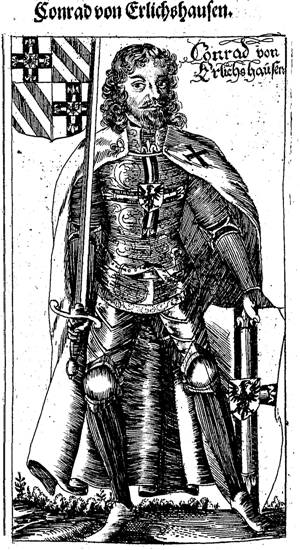

Grand Master of the Teutonic Knights
- Reign: 1441–1449
- Predecessor: Paul von Rusdorf
- Successor: Ludwig von Erlichshausen
- Born: 1390 or 1395; Ellrichshausen, Swabia
- Died: 1449; Malbork Castle

Konrad von Erlichshausen or Ellrichshausen, was born in 1390 or 1395 at Ellrichshausen, near Satteldorf in Swabia and died in 1449 in the Malbork Castle. He was the 30th Grand Master of the Teutonic Order he led from 1441 to 1449. He was succeeded by his cousin Ludwig von Erlichshausen.

Grand Master of the Teutonic Order
Preceded by Paul von Rusdorf	Hochmeister; 1441–1449	Succeeded by Ludwig von Erlichshausen
