= Siege of Marienburg =

Siege of Marienburg (or Siege of Malbork) may refer to:

- Siege of Marienburg (1410), unsuccessful siege by Polish-Lithuanian forces during the Polish–Lithuanian–Teutonic War
- Battle of Marienburg (1422), victory of Moldavian forces during the Golub War
- Siege of Malbork (1454), unsuccessful siege by Prussian Confederation-Jagiellonian forces during the Thirteen Years' War
- Siege of Marienburg (1457), unsuccessful siege by the Teutonic Order to recapture the city from the Kingdom of Poland
- Sieges of Marienburg (1657), two Russian sieges of Marienburg in Livonia
