= Battle of Marienburg (1422) =

Battle between Teutonic Order and Moldavia in 1422

- Part of the Golub War
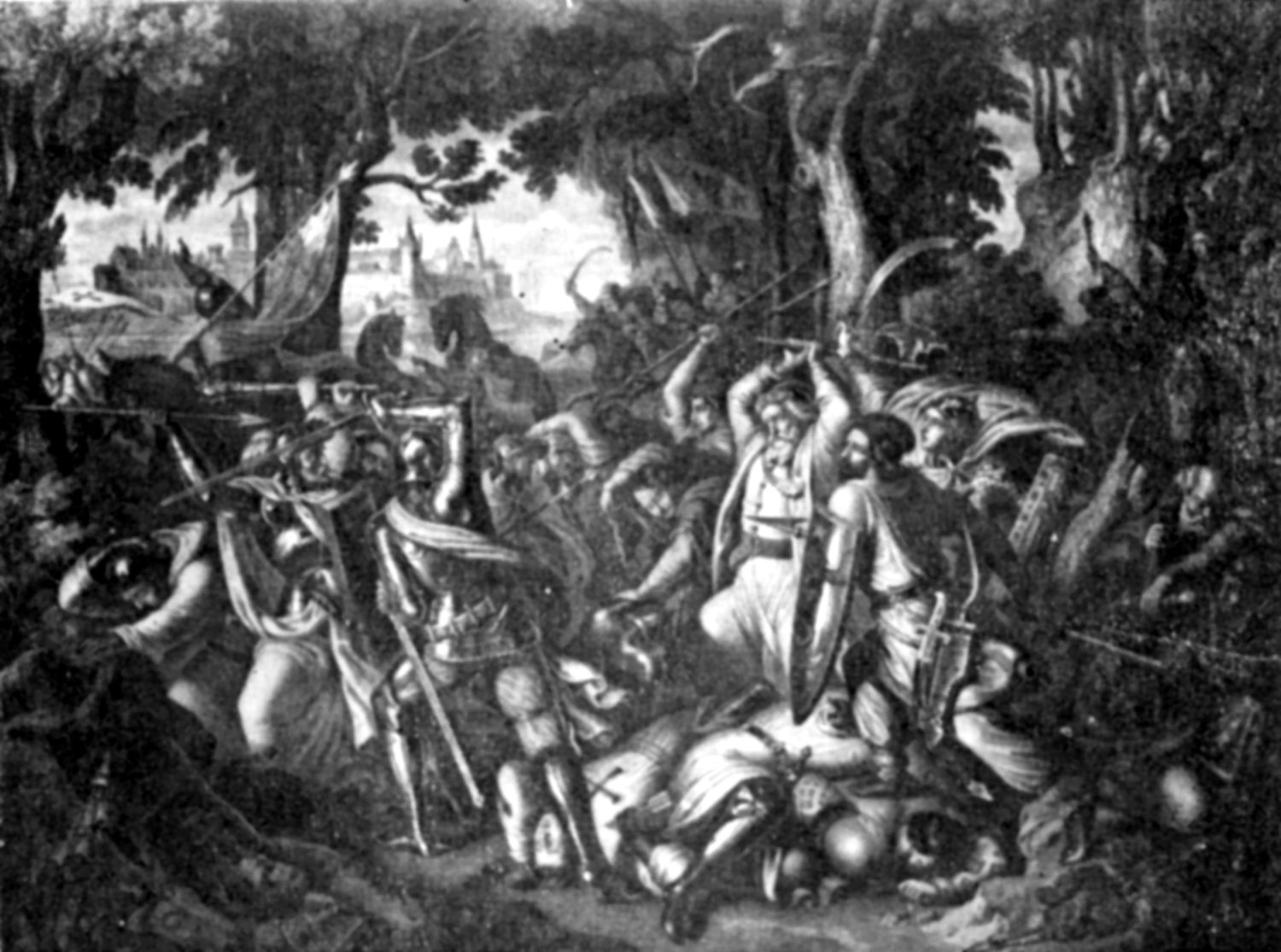
- Moldavian victory over the Teutonic Knights (1422)
Date	27 September 1422
Location	Marienburg Castle (Malbork Castle) 54°02′23″N 19°01′40″E
Result	Moldavian victory

Belligerents
Moldavia	Teutonic Order

Commanders and leaders
Alexander I	Paul von Rusdorf

Strength
400 Moldavian horsemen according to Jan Długosz	4,000 Teutonic Knights and German mercenaries according to Jan Długosz

Casualties and losses
150 killed and wounded according to Jan Długosz	3,000 killed 200 wounded 300 captured 300 deserted according to Jan Długosz

The Battle of Marienburg occurred during the Golub War, near Marienburg Castle (Malbork Castle), between the Moldavian cavalry of Alexander I and the Teutonic Knights of Paul von Rusdorf supported by the German mercenaries. It took place on 27 September 1422, resulting in Moldavian victory.

== Prelude ==
During the early 15th century, Moldavian voivode Alexander I was on good terms with the Kingdom of Poland. He provided support for the Polish forces during the Polish–Teutonic Wars, including in 1422.

Alexander I intended to strengthen his ties with the Grand Duchy of Lithuania, which resulted in his marriage to the Lithuanian princess Rimgailė. She attempted to convert him to Catholicism, but her efforts were unsuccessful, even as Alexander intended to face the Teutonic Knights near Marienburg Castle (Malbork Castle) in support of Poland and Lithuania during the Golub War.

== Battle ==
Detailed description of the battle appears in Jan Długosz's chronicle. Jan Długosz was a Polish chronicler who also chronicled the Battle of Grunwald and numerous other events related to the Polish–Teutonic Wars.

According to Jan Długosz, Moldavians took advantage of the fact that their enemy lacked archers. Existing archers on the Teutonic side were dispersed by Moldavians, forcing them to flee. Moldavian forces employed the feigned retreat tactic, luring the Teutonic Knights and German mercenaries out of the castle, which were then targeted by the Moldavian archery. First line of the knights was covered with arrows, confusing and scattering the rest of the Teutonic forces. Moldavian cavalry took the opportunity to deliver a decisive blow and inflict heavy losses on the enemy.

== Aftermath ==
According to Polish chronicler Jan Długosz, the 400 Moldavian horsemen "defeated a big army of the enemy and victoriously came back to the camp of the royal army loaded with a huge loot". Moldavians suffered 150 killed and wounded. However, the Teutonic Knights, alongside German mercenaries, suffered heavy losses of 3,000 killed, 200 wounded, 500 captured and 300 deserted, practically their entire force.

The Moldavian victory in battle didn't lead to capture of the Marienburg Castle (Malbork Castle), but it contributed to ending the Golub War on the same day, with the signing of Treaty of Melno as the Teutonic Order was put under pressure. This victory also raised the prestige of Alexander I in the Kingdom of Poland and Grand Duchy of Lithuania, which allowed Moldavia to claim ownership over the Pokuttia region.

== See also ==
- Siege of Marienburg (1410)
- Siege of Malbork (1454)
- Siege of Marienburg (1457–1460)
