= Moldavian military forces =

European military force (1346–1859)

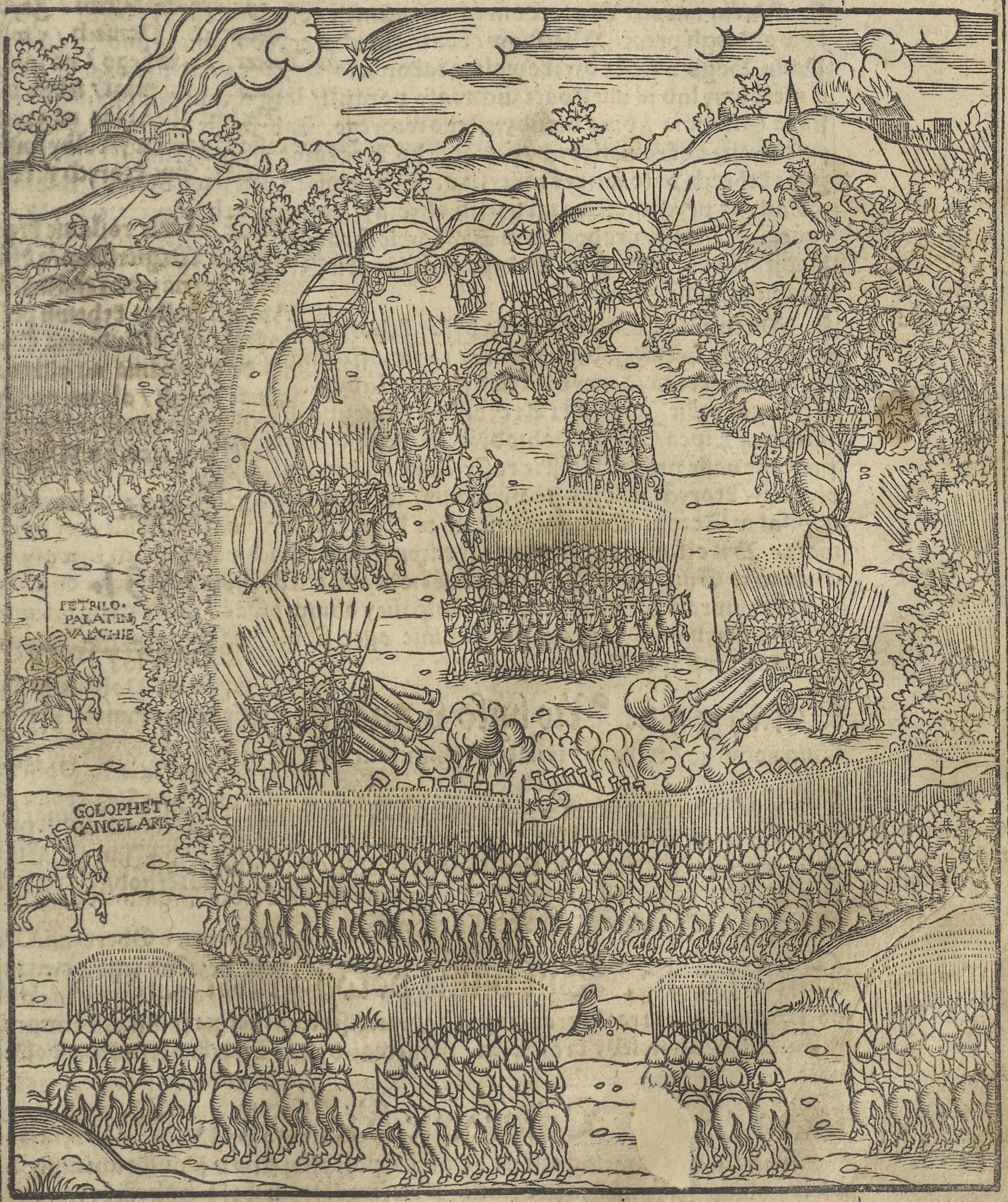
Moldavian troops engaging the Poles in the Battle of Obertyn (1531)

Moldavia had a military force for much of its history as an independent and, later, autonomous principality subject to the Ottoman Empire (14th century-1859).

== Army ==
=== Middle Ages ===
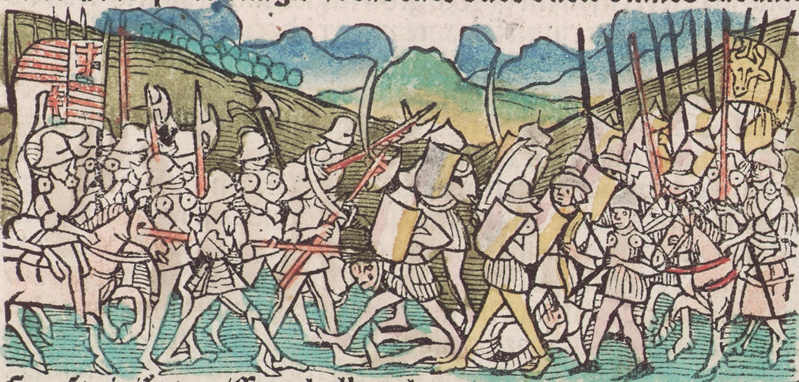
Moldavian troops in battle, as illustrated in Johannes de Thurocz (1488 edition); the Moldavian flag is displayed

Under the reign of Stephen the Great, all farmers and villagers had to bear arms. Stephen justified this by saying that "every man has a duty to defend his fatherland"; according to Polish chronicler Jan Długosz, if someone was found without carrying a weapon, he was sentenced to death. Stephen reformed the army by promoting men from the landed free peasantry răzeşi (i.e. something akin to freeholding yeomen) to infantry (voinici) and light cavalry (hânsari) to make himself less dependent on the boyars, and introduced his army to guns. In times of crises, The Small Host (Oastea Mică)—which consisted of around 10,000 to 12,000 men—stood ready to engage the enemy, while the Large Host (Oastea Mare)—which could reach up to 40,000—had all the free peasantry older than 14, and strong enough to carry a sword or use the bow, recruited. This seldom happened, for such a levée en masse was devastating for both economy and population growth. In the Battle of Vaslui, Stephen had to summon the Large Host and also recruited mercenary troops.

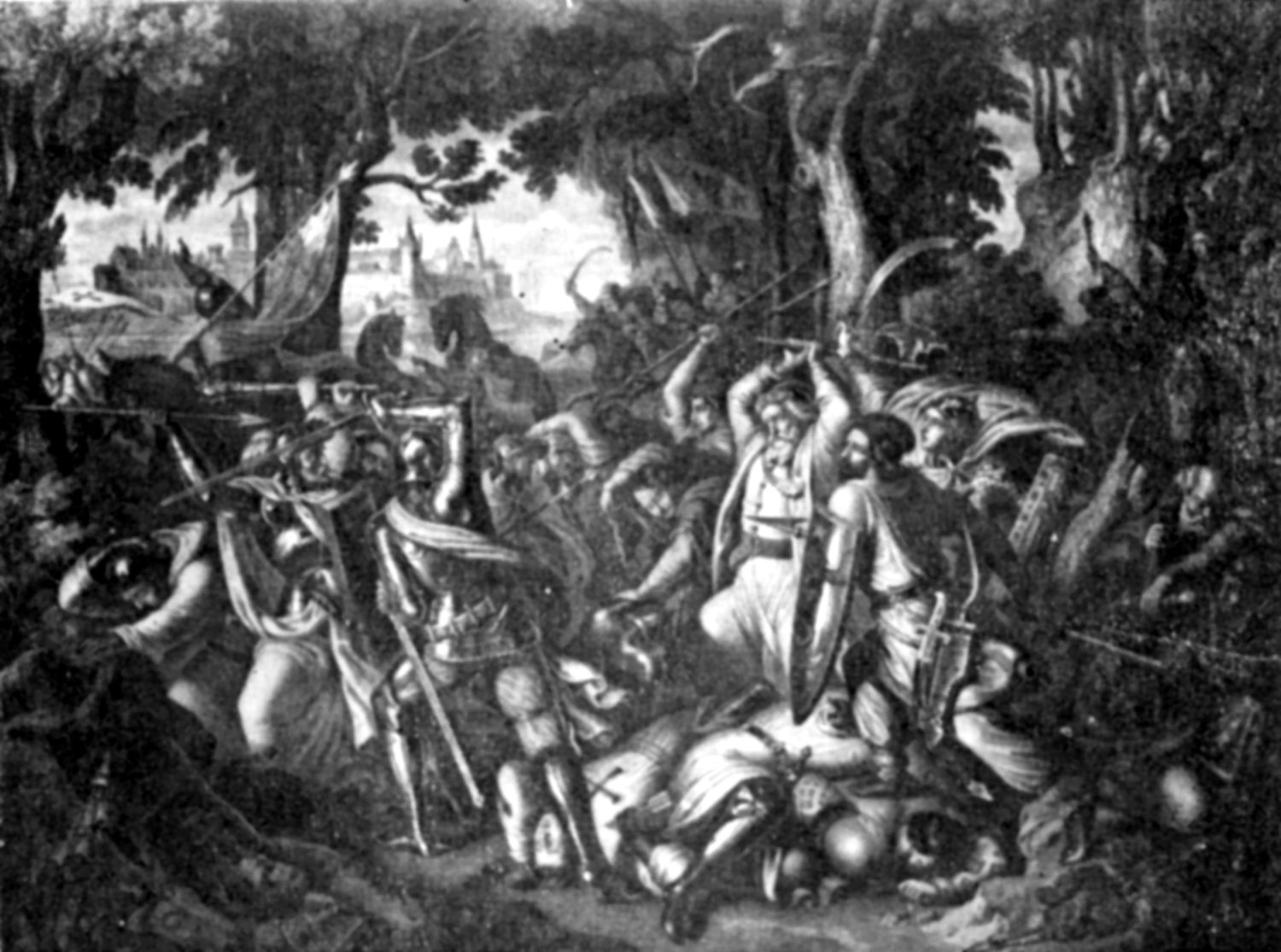
Moldavians engaging the Knights of Teutonic Order in the Battle of Marienburg (1422)

In the Middle Ages and early Renaissance, the Moldavians relied on light cavalry (călărași) which used hit-and-run tactics similar to those of the Tatars; this gave them great mobility and also flexibility, in case they found it more suitable to dismount their horses and fight in hand-to-hand combat, as it happened at Marienburg in 1422, when 400 horse archers were sent to aid Jagiellon Poland, Moldavia’s overlord against the Teutonic Knights. When making eye-contact with the enemy, the horse archers would withdraw to a nearby forest and camouflage themselves with leaves and branches; according to Jan Długosz, when the enemy entered the wood, they were "showered with arrows" and defeated. The heavy cavalry consisted of the nobility, namely, the boyars and their guards, the viteji (lit. "brave ones", small nobility) and the curteni—the Court Cavalry (all nominally part of the Small Host). In times of war, boyars were compelled by the feudal system of allegiance to supply the prince with troops in accordance with the extent of their manorial domain.

Other troops consisted of professional foot soldiers (lefegii) which fulfilled the heavy infantry role, and the plăieşi, free peasants whose role was that of border guards: they guarded the mountain passes and were prepared to ambush the enemy and to fight delaying actions.

In the absence of the prince, command was assigned to the Mare Spătar (Grand Sword-Bearer, a military office) or to the Mare Vornic (approx. Governor of the Country, a civilian office second only to the Voievod, which was filled by the prince himself). Supplying the troops was by tradition-later-made-into-law the duty of the inhabitants of those lands on which the soldiers were present at a given time.

The Moldavians' (as well as Wallachians') favourite military doctrine in (defensive) wars was a scorched earth policy combined with harassment of the advancing enemy using hit-and-run tactics and disruption of communication and supply lines, followed by a large scale ambush: a weakened enemy would be lured in a place where it would find itself in a position hard or impossible to defend. A general attack would follow, often with devastating results. The shattered remains of what was once the enemy army would be pursued closely and harassed all the way to the border and sometimes beyond. A typical example of successful employments of this scenario is the Battle of Vaslui.

=== Decline and refounding ===
Towards the end of the 15th century, especially after the success of guns and cannons, mercenaries became a dominant force in the country’s military. With the economic demands created by the stagnation of the Ottoman Empire, the force diminished and included only mercenaries such as the seimeni.

The 1829 Treaty of Adrianople allowed Moldavia to again maintain its own troops, no longer acting as an auxiliary under strict Ottoman supervision, and assigned red over blue pennants (see Flag and coat of arms of Moldavia). Their renewed existence under Mihail Sturdza was a major symbol and rally point for the nationalist cause, aiding in bringing about the 1848 Moldavian revolution.

== Fleet ==
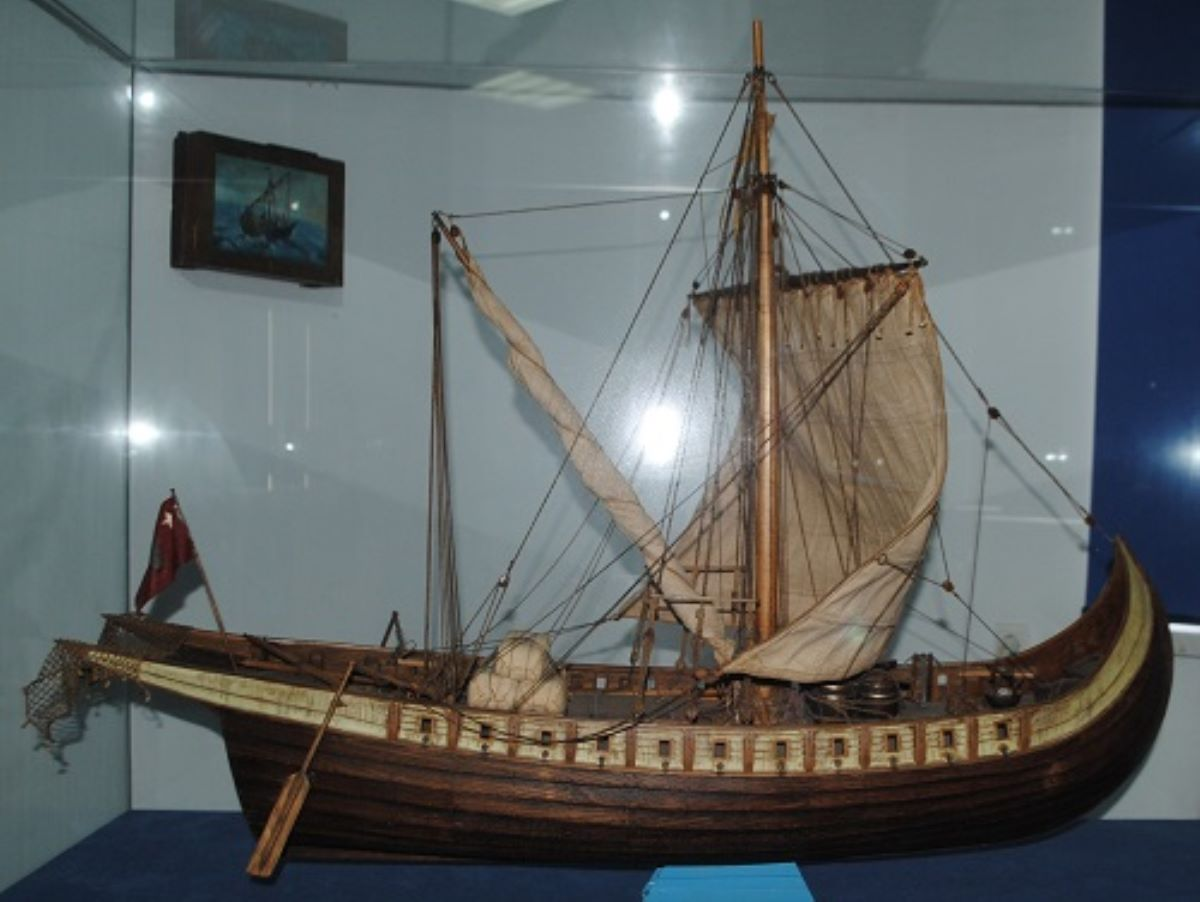
Model of a Moldavian pânzar on display at the National Museum of the Romanian Navy

During the 15th century, the Moldavians traded with their ships in both the Black Sea and in the Mediterranean Sea, their presence being reported as far as Crete.

During the time of Stephen the Great, the fleet of Moldavia consisted of sailing ships called pânzare. With a single mast featuring a square rig and crewed by 5-6 sailors and a helmsman, the pânzar was used in various military actions. The first documented mentions of a Moldavian naval fleet come from 1465 during the siege of Chilia. After the capture of Caffa by the Ottoman fleet led by Gedik Ahmed Pasha, the Moldavian pânzare captured some Ottoman ships carrying prisoners taken from the Genoese city. The prisoners were taken to a Moldavian port, where the Ottomans demanded their extradition. Their demands were declined by the Voivode. The Moldavian ships from Chilia and Cetatea Albă, further captured several other Turkish ships.

Another mention of the Moldavian fleet is found in connection with the rule of Aron Tiranul, who used it to help Wallachian ruler Michael the Brave establish his control over the Chilia branch of the Danube and Dobruja.

The Treaty of Adrianople provided for a Moldavian self-defense naval force, to be composed of caicque vessels. Schooners armed with cannons were first built in the 1840s. Along with patrolling the Danube, these made their way on its tributaries, the Siret and the Prut River.

== See also ==
- Wallachian military forces
