= Benedict Makrai =

Hungarian noble and diplomat

- Born: 1360s Szatmár County (?), Kingdom of Hungary
- Died: 1421/1427
- Noble family: gens Szentemágócs
- Father: Blaise Gacsalkéri

Benedict Makrai (Latin: Benedictus de Macra, Hungarian: Makrai Benedek, Polish: Benedykt Makrai; 1360s – 1421/1427) was a well-educated Hungarian noble and diplomat in the service of Sigismund of Luxemburg, King of Hungary and later Holy Roman Emperor. He is best known for his 1412–13 mission to Poland–Lithuania to mediate their territorial dispute with the Teutonic Knights over Samogitia and Masovia in the aftermath of the Battle of Grunwald (1410). His mission did not resolve the dispute and only heightened the tensions.

== Early life and education ==
Makrai was probably born in the second half of the 1360s. His birthplace is not known, but speculated to be in the Szatmár County now split between north-western Romania and north-eastern Hungary. He came from the Gacsalkér branch of the Szentemágócs kindred as the son of Blaise. His brothers were Sebastian, who served as ispán of the chamber of salt (Hungarian: sókamaraispán, mentioned in this capacity in 1397 and 1403, and Stephen, the vice-ispán of Baranya County under Nicholas Garai (around 1388). His family possessed Gacsalkér (today Chier, Romania), laid at the foot of Makra Mountains in Zaránd County, Transylvania (present-day Munții Zarandului), after which – as a broader region – Benedict referred to himself during his studies abroad. In 1384, it was complained before the Arad Chapter that Blaise and his three sons, litteratus Sebastian, Stephen and Benedict seized the mills along the river Fehér-Körös (Crișul Alb), which once were built by archdeacon Sixtus.

After receiving education in Hungary, he attended the Charles University in Prague where he earned master's degree in arts in 1387 and was an examiner in 1388. He soon moved to the University of Vienna where he taught astronomy, one of the arts of the classical quadrivium curriculum, based on Arabic scholar Alchabitius until 1391. He earned licentiate in canon law from the University of Paris by April 1398 and likely a doctorate soon after. He continued his studies and earned the doctorate in civil law from the University of Padua in 1401.

== Rebellion against Sigismund ==
Upon his return to native Hungary, Makrai became a professor at the University of Óbuda, founded in 1395. He also got involved in a succession conflict over the Kingdom of Hungary between Ladislaus of Naples and Sigismund of Luxemburg. Rebellious Hungarian nobles imprisoned Sigismund in April 1401 and crowned Ladislaus as King of Hungary in August 1403. However, Ladislaus' army was defeated at Pápoc in September 1403 and Makrai, who had supported Ladislaus, was imprisoned at the end of 1403. His university friends arranged his release in 1408 and, against the odds, he won the king's favor and become his trusted advisor. German chronicler Eberhard Windeck noted that Makrai was sent to diplomatic missions to Catalonia, France, England.

== Mission to Poland–Lithuania ==
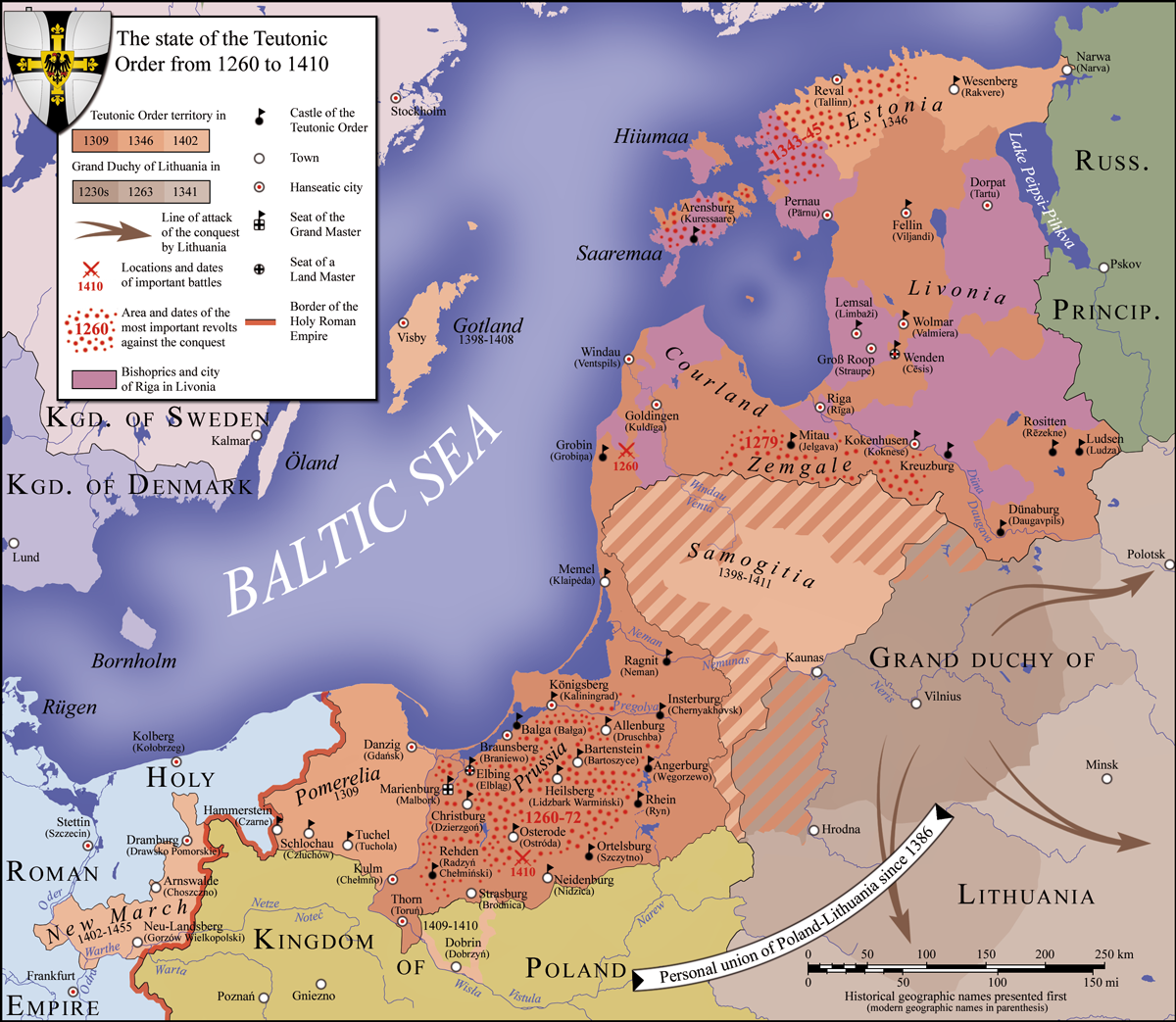
Map of the Teutonic Order between 1260 and 1410: Samogitia separated the two crusader branches (Teutonic Order in Prussia and Livonian Order in Livonia)

From October 1412 to June 1413, he was sent to the Kingdom of Poland and the Grand Duchy of Lithuania as arbiter in their long territorial dispute with the Teutonic Order over Samogitia. Officially, his task was only to inspect and determine the southern and eastern borders of Samogitia which had never been defined. Makrai first arrived to Marienburg, capital of the Teutonic Order, and received a cold welcome. He then traveled via Ragnit to Trakai where Grand Duke Vytautas organized a feast, knighted Makrai, and showered him with expensive gifts, including golden belt and spurs.

The arbitration took place in January 1413 in Kaunas. The Order presented many documents, reaching as far back as donations by King Mindaugas in the 1250s and early 1260s, showing the numerous times that Samogitia was transferred to them (most recently by the Peace of Raciąż of 1404). They also extracted from Vytautas and King Jogaila a confirmation that, as agreed by the Peace of Thorn (1411), Samogitia was ruled by Lithuania only temporarily, i.e. only for the lifetime of Vytautas and Jogaila. However, two days later, this confirmation was protested by representatives of their heirs – Vytautas' married daughter Sophia and Jogaila's infant daughter Hedwig. They argued that Vytautas and Jogaila had no right to transfer Samogitia without the approval of their heirs. The protest was joined by 14 Samogitian nobles who argued that the transfer was invalid without the approval of Samogitian nobility which enjoyed greater privileges and had the right to select their ruler.

When direct negotiations failed, Makrai returned to his primary goal of determining the border. Both sides presented numerous documents, brought witnesses for testimonies, and swore under oath in support of their position. Particular points of contention were Veliuona and Pieštvė, Lithuanian fortresses destroyed during the Lithuanian Crusade and rebuilt by Vytautas, and Memel, Teutonic castle since 1252. Makrai departed Lithuania by the end of February and traveled to Poland to investigate various territorial claims in Mazovia. He was presented evidence that Pomerelia with Gdańsk was once Polish. He also collected proof that Teutonic Order was not following previous agreements, for example regarding release of prisoners, and sent a couple admonishing letters to Teutonic Grand Master Heinrich von Plauen. On 3 May 1413, Makrai delivered his final decision and recognized that Samogitia took up the entire right bank of the Neman River, including Memel (Klaipėda), and thus should belong to Lithuania. The Teutonic Order refused to recognize this ruling, accused Makrai of accepting bribes, and started a campaign to discredit both Makrai and Lithuanian dukes (they fabricated a story that Vytautas' grandfather Gediminas was a low-born hostler of Vytenis). Makrai completed his mission in June 1413 leaving growing tensions behind that spilled into the short but devastating Hunger War in summer 1414. The territorial dispute was settled only by the Treaty of Melno in 1422.

== Later career ==
During the Council of Constance (1414–1418), Makrai was a member of a small group of special advisers to King Sigismund, joining to the Hungarian contingent from Paris in 1416. There, he was granted the honorary title of royal knight in that year. Makrai also accompanied the King on his western European trip in high hopes of uniting Christian Europe by ending the Western Schism and brokering peace in the resumed Hundred Years' War between France and England. He was present in Canterbury in August 1416. Thereafter, he was part of the diplomatic mission led by Palatine Nicholas Garai to Paris. He resided in Calais in September 1416. His social connections in England and France proved beneficial to the king. From France, he returned to Constance. In 1418, Sigismund summoned him from Constance to settle another Polish–Lithuanian conflict. Makrai stayed in Pforzheim in August 1418. He acted as co-judge beside the monarch in Passau in November 1418. He returned to Hungary in the king's retinue in early 1419.

In June 1420, October 1420 and March 1421 letters King Sigismund addressed Makrai as the secular administrator of the Bishopric of Eger and in June 1421 Pope Martin V confirmed his honorary title of the Count of the Sacred Lateran Palace (comes sacri Lateranensis palatii). That is the last information available on Makrai. He died sometime before 1427. Since his nephew Ladislaus, the archdeacon of Küküllő was also deceased by that time, their lands in Zaránd County were escheated to the Crown, which King Sigismund then granted to the Losonci family.
