= Michael Küchmeister von Sternberg =

Michał Küchmeister von Sternberg
- Hochmeister
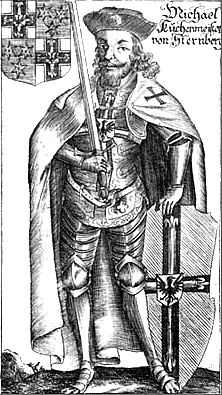

Grand Master of the Teutonic Knights
- Reign: 1414 to 1422
- Predecessor: Heinrich von Plauen
- Successor: Paul von Rusdorf
- Born: 1360 or 1370; Silesia
- Died: December 15, 1423 (aged 52–63); Danzig
- Burial: Chapel of St. Anna, Malbork Castle

Michael Küchmeister von Sternberg (1360 or 1370–15 December 1423) was the 28th Grand Master of the Teutonic Knights, serving from 1414 to 1422.

== Biography ==
Küchmeister was born in Silesia, as a son of Saxon nobility. He was the procurator of Rastenburg (Rastembork) (1396–1402) and the Großschäffer of Königsberg (1402–1405). After the Peace of Raciąż of 1404, he held the position of Vogt of Samogitia, and from 1410, the Vogt of the Neumark (Nowy Targ). After the Battle of Grunwald, he tried with his army of mercenaries and vassals to re-take the regions lost by the Teutonic Order. In September 1410, Küchmeister lost the Battle of Koronowo and was captured by the Polish army, remaining in prison until the summer of 1411. The defeat prompted the signing of the Peace of Thorn (1411).

In the aftermath of the defeat at Grunwald, the Teutonic Order lost much of its military and economic importance, and the mindset of the Old Prussians had shifted. When Grand Master Heinrich von Plauen marched against the Kingdom of Poland, his army of Prussian nobles and villagers stationed at Lautenburg (Lidzbark Welski) refused to fight on 29 September 1413. As a result, von Plauen was relieved of his position as Grand Master by Küchmeister.

On 7 January 1414, Küchmeister was chosen as the 28th Grand Master of the Teutonic Order. Although he preferred negotiations over war, he strengthened Marienburg Castle (Malbork Castle) with an additional wall on the north side. He resigned in March 1422, shortly before the Gollub War.

Küchmeister died in Danzig (Gdańsk) and was buried in the mausoleum under the Chapel of St. Anna in Marienburg Castle.

Grand Master of the Teutonic Order
Preceded by Heinrich von Plauen	Hochmeister; 1414–1422	Succeeded by Paul von Rusdorf
