= Heinrich von Plauen =

27th Grand Master of the Teutonic Knights (1410–1413)

- Hochmeister
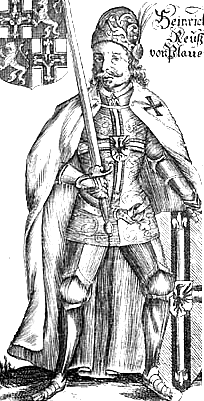
- 17th century depiction of Heinrich from Christoph Hartknoch's Old and New Prussia or a Two-Part History of Prussia

Grand Master of the Teutonic Knights
- Reign: November 1410 - October 1413
- Predecessor: Ulrich von Jungingen
- Successor: Michael Küchmeister von Sternberg
- Born: c. 1370; Vogtland
- Died: 1429; Lochstädt (Pavlovo)
- Burial: Malbork Castle

Heinrich von Plauen (the Elder) (c. 1370 – 1429) was the 27th Grand Master of the Teutonic Knights, serving from November 1410 to October 1413. Having becoming grandmaster in the wake of the Battle of Grunwald, he was a stern proponent of prolonging the war with Lithuania and Poland. Because all male members of his family were baptized as Heinrich (Henry), he is sometimes known as Heinrich von Plauen the Elder to differentiate from his relative, Heinrich von Plauen the Younger (died ca. 1441).

== Early career ==
Von Plauen was born in Vogtland, between Thuringia and Saxony around 1370. He arrived in Prussia around 1390 as the Order's guest, but later became a full member. He did not hold any important positions until 1402 when he became the Komtur of Nessau (Nieszawa). He was promoted to Komtur of Schwetz (Świecie) in 1407.

Von Plauen did not take part in the Battle of Grunwald on 15 July 1410. Upon receiving the news of the Order's defeat, he took the initiative and assembled an army of 3,000 men to defend Marienburg, the capital of the Order. He correctly suspected that it was where the victorious Polish and Lithuanian armies were headed. He also sent letters, acting as the Grand Master, to Germany asking for additional troops and money. Von Plauen arrived at Marienburg on time and energetically organized the defense. The Siege of Marienburg started on 26 July and remained until 19 September 1410. The King of Poland, Jogaila, did not expect strong resistance and was not prepared for a long-term siege. The siege, holding Jogaila's army in place, helped to organize defensive forces in other parts of Prussia and gave time for relief to arrive from the Livonian Order and Germany. Jogaila had to retreat. Von Plauen ordered his forces to pursue the retreating Polish army and recaptured all fortresses (except those on the Polish–Prussian border) by the end of October.

In November 1410 for his services in the defense of Marienburg and Prussia, von Plauen was chosen as the 27th Grand Master of the Order, overtaking other officials of the Order with higher positions, like Werner von Tettingen, the Order's Minister of Diplomacy and the Komtur of Elbing (Elbląg), who fought in the Battle of Grunwald. Von Plauen inherited a difficult task of rebuilding Order's fortresses, restoring the economy, recruiting new Knights, and defending the Order's reputation in Europe.

== Grand Master ==
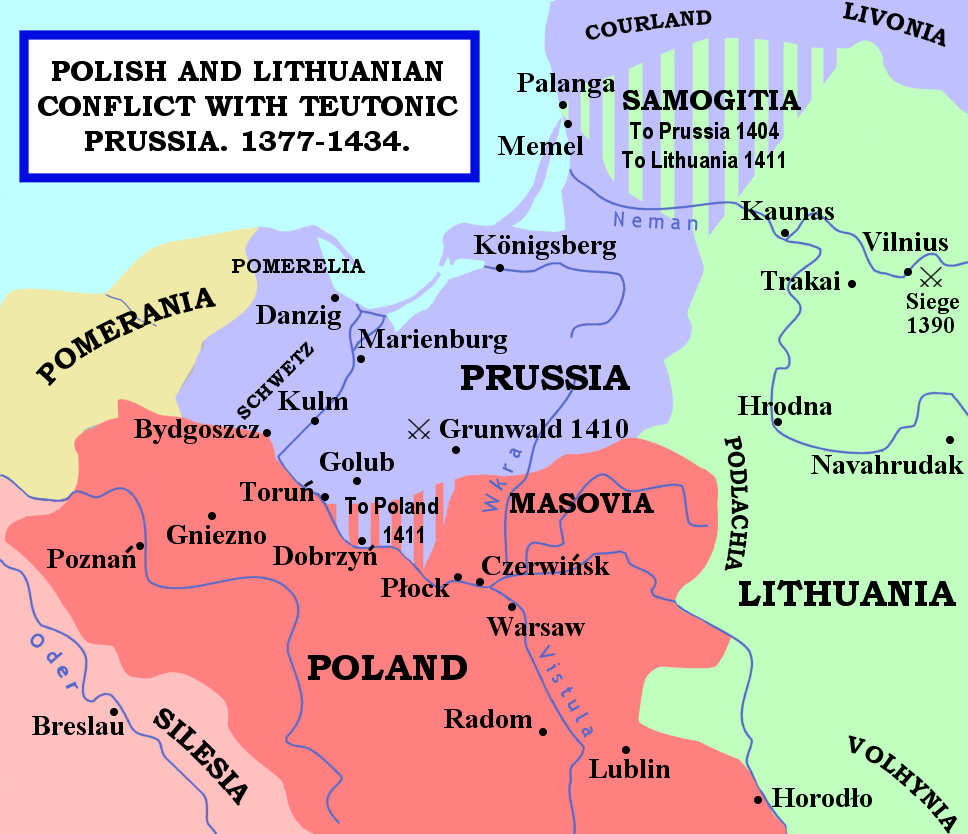
Polish and Lithuanian conflict with Teutonic Knights

Von Plauen's major diplomatic accomplishment was signing the Peace of Thorn on 1 February 1411. The peace was rather favorable to the Order: it retained its core territories. The Order assigned Samogitia to Grand Duke of Lithuania Vytautas the Great for his and Jogaila's lifetime. After their death Samogitia was to return to the Order. The border was not decided by the peace – an international commission was to mediate further negotiations. Poland received Dobrzyń Land and Kuyavia. The Order was to pay a large ransom for prisoners of war and war indemnity, equivalent to six million Prague groschen, in four installments.

The coat of arms of Heinrich von Plauen as the Grand Master of the Teutonic Order

To raise the money for the first installment, von Plauen called representatives of Prussian cities to Osterode (Ostróda) in February 1411. He proposed a special assessment of 1 2/3% on cities' possession. All cities, except for Danzig (Gdańsk), agreed. Because the decision was not unanimous, von Plauen called a second meeting, this time in Elbing (Elbląg). Thorn (Toruń) joined Danzig in opposition to the tax. Von Plauen decided to enforce the assessment. Thorn capitulated without much resistance, while Danzig resisted blockade until 5 April 1411.

Von Plauen actively fought off the opposition of the Lizard Union. In 1411 von Plauen discovered a plot by Georg von Wirsberg, Komtur of Rehden (Radzyń Chełmiński), and ordered the beheading of Nicholas von Renys, one of the four knights who formed the Lizard Union, for helping the Poles. The execution took place in Graudenz (Grudziądz), which brought him even less popularity.

The first two installment payments were made on time. When von Plauen saw that he could not make the third payment on time he asked Sigismund, Holy Roman Emperor for help. Sigismund agreed to mediate and the parties met in Breslau (Wrocław) in March 1412. In August 1412 the emperor delivered his decision that the Peace of Thorn was just and that a commission should negotiate a reduction to the war indemnity. Another commission would decide the border between Samogitia and Prussia and inhabitants of the region would be given a choice to remain in Samogitia and become part of the Grand Duchy of Lithuania or to relocate to Prussia and become part of the monastic state of the Teutonic Knights. To universal surprise von Plauen made the final payment on time in January 1413. The commission regarding Samogitian borders did meet. On 3 May 1413 Benedict Makrai, appointed by Sigismund, decided that the right bank of the Neman River, including Memel (Klaipėda), should belong to Lithuania.

Despite the Order's financial troubles and weakened military capability after the defeat of 1410, von Plauen started preparations for another war with the Kingdom of Poland. He rejected decision by Benedict Macra and by late summer 1413 gathered 6,000 men near the border with Pomerania and 15,000 on the border with Dobrzyń Land and Masovia (commended by Michael Küchmeister von Sternberg). The time seemed right as Jogaila was busy in the south while Vytaut waged a war against Novgorod. Küchmeister attacked northern Poland, but returned only after 16 days. Attack on Pomerania was similarly stopped by disobedient Knights.

== Removal from office ==
Von Plauen was removed from his office on 9 October 1413 by Michael Küchmeister von Sternberg, the grand marshal and Komtur of Königsberg (Kaliningrad). Küchmeister disapproved of von Plauen's decision to wage another war and supported further peace talks with the Kingdom of Poland and the Grand Duchy of Lithuania. The general chapter convened five days later. Herman Gans was appointed as an interim Grand Master until a formal general assembly would meet in January 1414. Von Plauen officially resigned and Küchmeister was appointed as the next Grand Master. Von Plauen was first appointed as a Komtur to a minor fortress, but was soon arrested when Jogaila did not support the new regime and demanded the return of von Plauen to his office. Küchmeister unsuccessfully reopened diplomatic talks with Poland and a brief Hunger War broke out in summer 1414.

Heinrich von Plauen was released from Danzig jail in 1418. At that time he became the procurator of Lochstädt (Pavlovo) near Königsberg, where he died in 1429.

Grand Master of the Teutonic Order
Preceded by Ulrich von Jungingen	Hochmeister; 1410–1413	Succeeded by Michael Küchmeister von Sternberg
