= Mełno, Grudziądz County =

Mełno
- Village
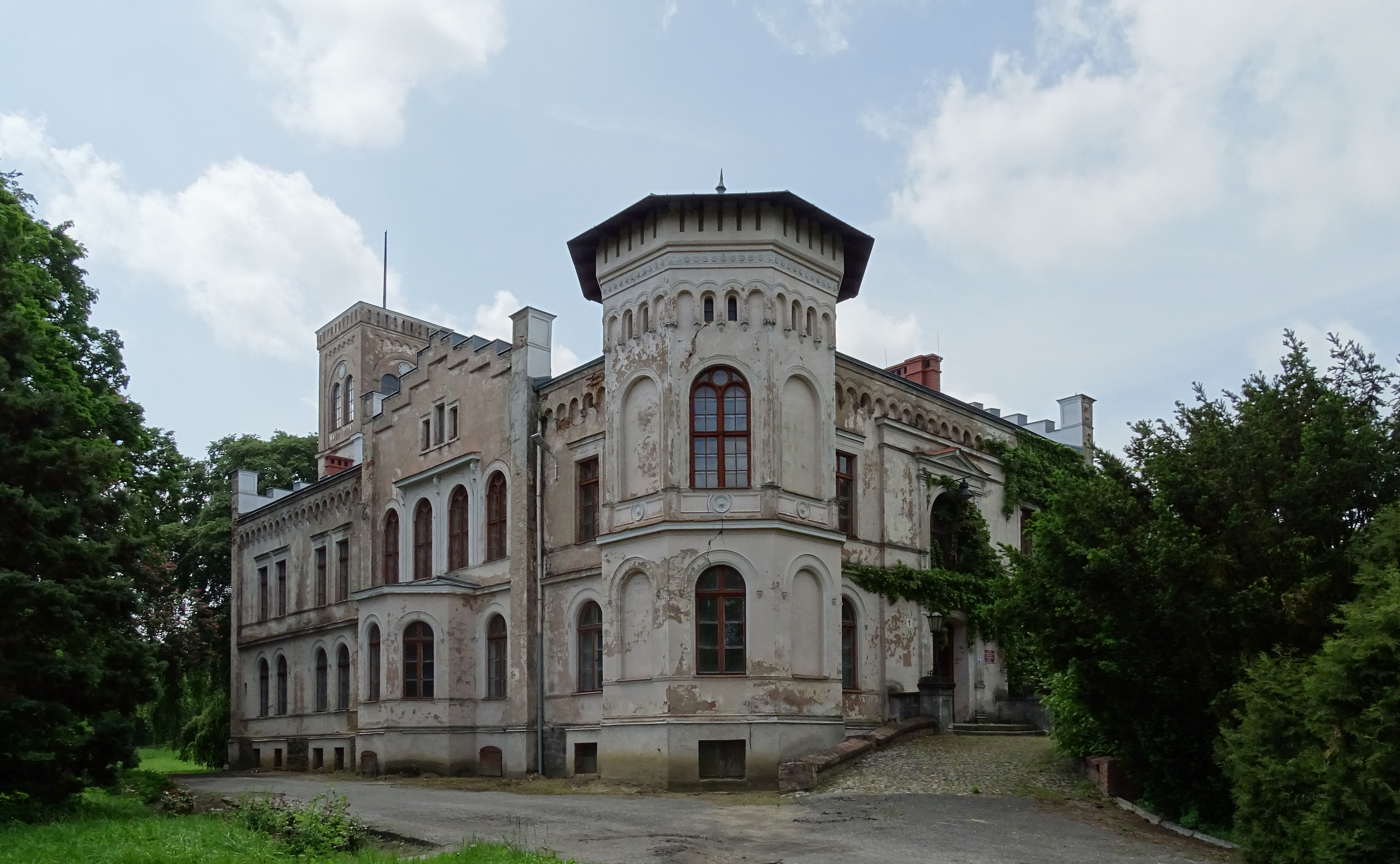
- Mełno Palace

- Location within Poland
- Coordinates: 53°26′06″N 18°56′12″E
- Country: Poland
- Voivodeship: Kuyavian-Pomeranian
- County: Grudziądz
- Gmina: Gruta
- Time zone: UTC+1 (CET)
  - Summer (DST): UTC+2 (CEST)
- Vehicle registration: CGR

Mełno [ˈmɛu̯nɔ] is a village in the administrative district of Gmina Gruta, within Grudziądz County, Kuyavian-Pomeranian Voivodeship, in north-central Poland.

== History ==
The Treaty of Melno was signed in the village in 1422. A monument commemorates the treaty.

During the German occupation of Poland (World War II), Mełno was one of the sites of executions of Poles, carried out by the Germans in 1939 as part of the Intelligenzaktion.

== Transport ==
There is a train station in the village.
