= Hunger War =

15th-century conflict of the Polish–Teutonic Wars

- Part of the Polish–Teutonic Wars
Date	Summer 1414
Location	State of the Teutonic Order
Result	Mediation at the Council of Constance

Belligerents
Kingdom of Poland; Grand Duchy of Lithuania	Teutonic State

Commanders and leaders
(Kingdom of Poland) Jogaila (Grand Duchy of Lithuania) Vytautas	(State of the Teutonic Order) Michael Küchmeister von Sternberg

The Hunger War (German: Hungerkrieg, Polish: Wojna głodowa) or Famine War was a brief conflict between the allied Kingdom of Poland, and Grand Duchy of Lithuania, against the Teutonic Knights in summer 1414 in an attempt to resolve territorial disputes. The war earned its name from destructive scorched earth tactics followed by both sides. While the conflict ended without any major political results, famine and plague swept through Prussia. According to Johann von Posilge, 86 friars of the Teutonic Order died from plague following the war. In comparison, approximately 200 friars perished in the Battle of Grunwald of 1410, one of the biggest battles in medieval Europe.

== Background ==
After the Polish–Lithuanian–Teutonic War of 1410–1411 not all issues between the Grand Duchy of Lithuania and Teutonic Knights were settled. The most contentious matter was the border between Samogitia and Prussia. Grand Duke of Lithuania Vytautas the Great demanded the entire right bank of the Neman River including the town of Memel (Klaipėda). The Knights demanded that after deaths of Vytautas and Jogaila, King of Poland, Samogitia would pass to them. Sigismund, Holy Roman Emperor, agreed to mediate the dispute and appointed Benedict Makrai to hear the arguments. On 3 May 1413, Benedict made the decision and recognized the right bank of the Neman River, including Klaipėda, to Lithuania. The Knights refused to accept this decision and Teutonic Grand Master Heinrich von Plauen ordered Teutonic armies into northern Poland. The army, commanded by Michael Küchmeister von Sternberg, returned into Prussia after just 16 days of campaign. The knights did not believe that the Order, still recovering from the defeat in the Battle of Grunwald in 1410, was ready for another war with Poland. Küchmeister deposed von Plauen and became the Grand Master. He attempted to reopen the negotiations with Poland in May 1414. As King Jogaila demanded to reinstate von Plauen and refused any attempts at a compromise, the talks broke down.

== War ==
In the summer of 1414, armies of King Jogaila and Grand Duke Vytautas invaded Prussia, ruled by the monastic state. They advanced through Osterode (Ostróda) into Warmia, plundering villages and burning crops. The Teutonic Knights chose to concentrate their defensive efforts in Culmerland (Chełmno Land). The Knights remained in their castles and refused an open battle after realizing the superiority of Polish and Lithuanian forces in a potential pitched battle. Küchmeister deployed scorched earth tactics hoping to deprive invading armies of food and supplies. This tactic later resulted in a famine and plague in the region. The invaders themselves were not able or willing to seek a decisive military victory via lengthy sieges of Teutonic castles. Papal legate William of Lausanne proposed resolving the conflict through diplomacy and a two-year truce was signed in Strasburg (now Brodnica) in October. Jogaila and Vytautas agreed to present their case to the Council of Constance. However, the territorial disputes were not resolved until the Treaty of Melno in 1422.
