= Pień, Kuyavian-Pomeranian Voivodeship =

Pień
- Village
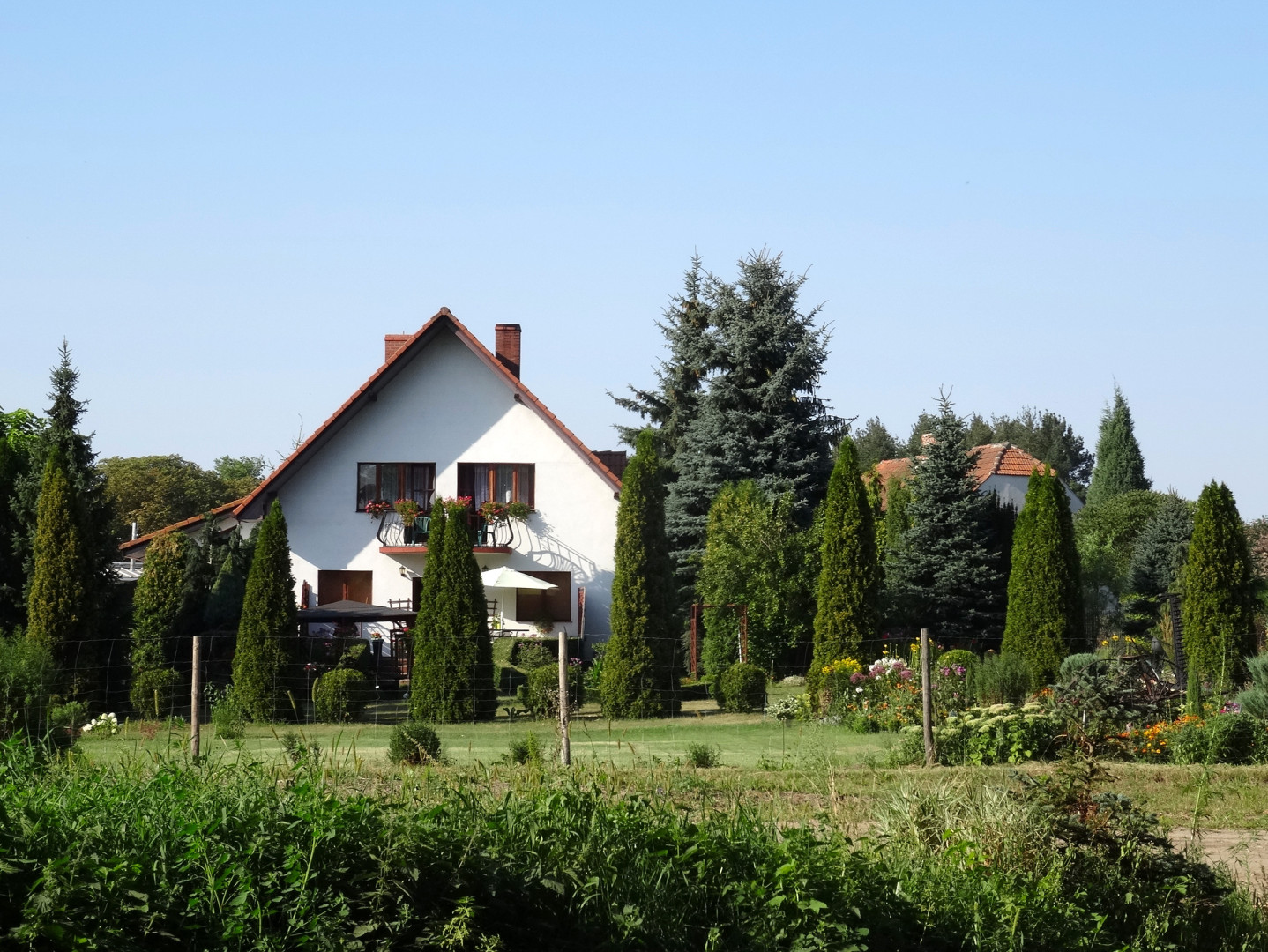
- A building in Pień

- Location within Poland
- Coordinates: 53°10′50″N 18°12′48″E
- Country: Poland
- Voivodeship: Kuyavian-Pomeranian
- County: Bydgoszcz
- Gmina: Dąbrowa Chełmińska
- Time zone: UTC+1 (CET)
  - Summer (DST): UTC+2 (CEST)
- Vehicle registration: CBY

Pień [pjɛɲ] is a village in the administrative district of Gmina Dąbrowa Chełmińska, within Bydgoszcz County, Kuyavian-Pomeranian Voivodeship, in north-central Poland.

== History ==
The village was the site of a former Teutonic Order fortification of their Procurator.

Pień was a private village, administratively located in the Chełmno Voivodeship of the Kingdom of Poland.
