= Siege of Marienburg (1454) =

Coordinates: 54°2′N 19°2′E

- Part of the Thirteen Years' War
Date	27 February 1454 – September 1454
Location	Marienburg (modern Malbork)
Result	Teutonic victory

Belligerents
State of the Teutonic Order	Prussian Confederation	Kingdom of Poland/Duchy of Lithuania

Commanders and leaders
Ludwig von Erlichshausen	Gabriel von Baysen; Johannes von Baysen	Casimir IV Jagiellon

Casualties and losses
Unknown	Unknown	Heavy 300 captured

Siege of Marienburg occurred during the Thirteen Years' War between the Teutonic Knights and the Kingdom of Poland. Marienburg was the capital of the state of the Teutonic Order, in particular, the residence of the Grand Master of the order. An alliance of Prussians and Poles besieged the city beginning 27 February 1454 with mercenaries from Danzig (Gdańsk), and the necessary artillery.

== Background ==
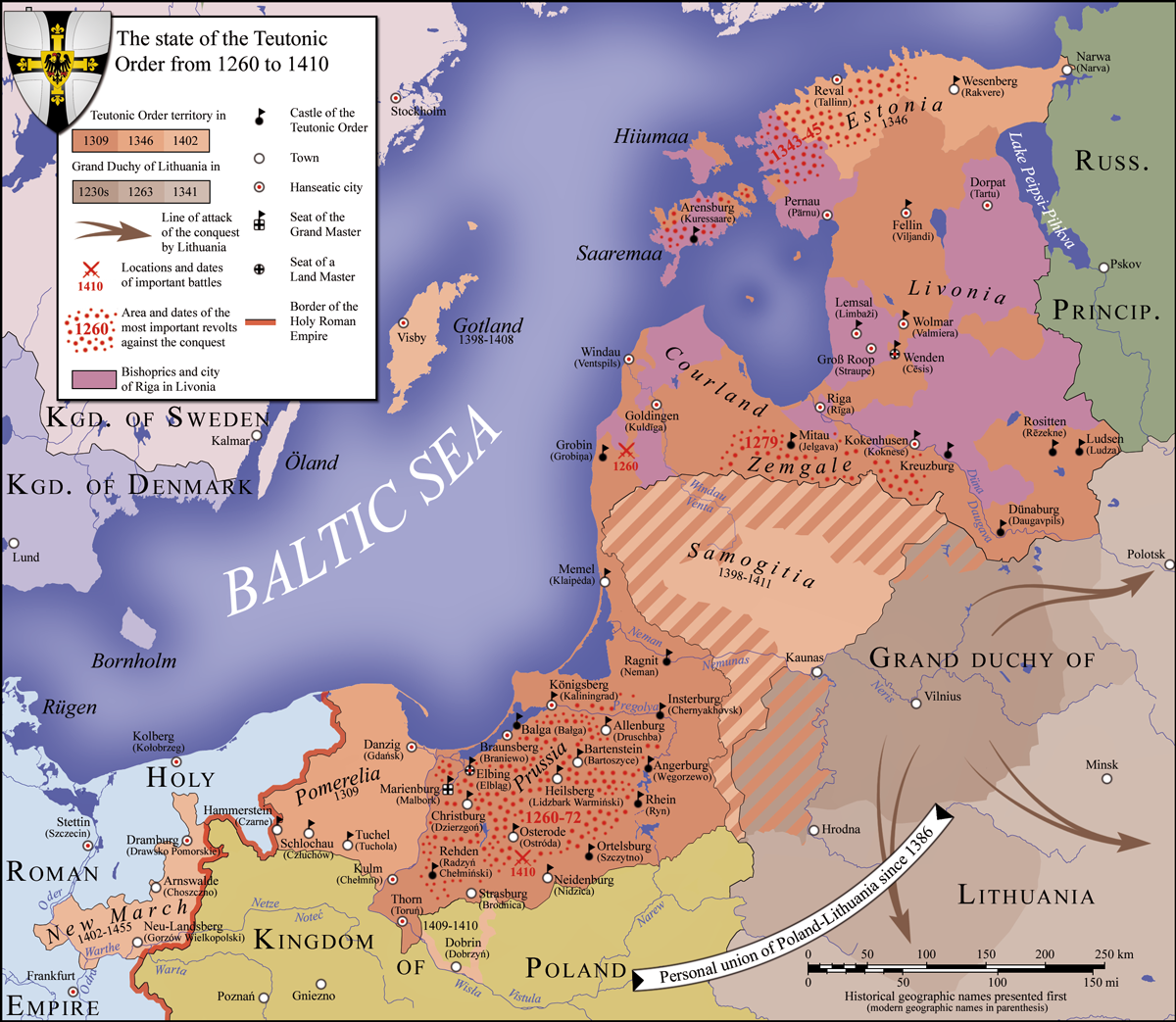
Teutonic state in 1410

In 1230, following the Golden Bull of Rimini, the Grand Master of the Teutonic Order, Hermann von Salza, and Duke Konrad I of Masovia launched the Prussian Crusade, a joint invasion with the prince of Poland, of Prussia intended to Christianize the Old Prussians living along the Baltic Sea. The Teutonic Knights moved against their Polish hosts and, with the Holy Roman Emperor's support, annexed Kulmerland (also called Ziemia Chelminska and now called Chełmno Land) into their own property. Subsequently, the Order created the independent Monastic State of the Teutonic Knights, adding continuously to their own holdings from the conquered Prussians' territory, and made little distinction between Prussian territory and that ruled and/or claimed by the Polish princes. They subsequently conquered Livonia.

The Order theoretically lost its main purpose in Europe, the Christianization of Lithuania. However, it initiated numerous campaigns against its Christian neighbors, the Kingdom of Poland, the Grand Duchy of Lithuania, and the Novgorod Republic (after assimilating the Livonian Order). The Teutonic Knights had a strong economic base, and could hire mercenaries from throughout Europe to augment their feudal levies, and became a naval power in the Baltic Sea. By the late fourteenth century, the Knights became the strong-arm of German Imperial policy in the Baltic Region, imposing the Holy Roman Emperor's will upon both the non-Christianized peoples and subjugated Poles, Pomeranians, Livonians, Lithuanies, and residents of such mercantile cities as Danzig.

In 1410, a Polish-Lithuanian army decisively defeated the Order and broke its military power at the Battle of Grunwald (Tannenberg). The dispute between the Kingdom of Poland and the Teutonic Order over control of Pomerelia (Polish: Pomorze Gdańskie) had lasted since the 1308 Teutonic takeover of Danzig (Gdańsk) when that territory was taken from Poland and annexed by the Teutonic Order. This event resulted in a series of Polish–Teutonic Wars throughout the 14th and 15th centuries. In the 15th century, the towns of Prussia rapidly grew economically. However, this was not followed by an increase in their political influence.

Over time, the kings of Poland denounced the Order of holding lands rightfully theirs, specifically Chełmno Land and Polish lands that would be conquered later, such as Pomerelia, Kujawy, and Dobrzyń Land. Furthermore, the rule of the Teutonic Knights was seen as increasingly anachronistic—taxes (customs) and the system of grain licenses (every trader had to pay large fees for the privilege of trading grain) hindered economic development in the province. At the same time the nobility sought a larger say in the running of the country, and were looking enviously at neighboring Poland, where the Polish nobility enjoyed wider privileges. The Knights were also accused of violating the few existing privileges of the nobility and the cities. Craftsmen were discontented because of competition from so-called partacze, or artisans settled by the Knights near their castles. Kashubians, Poles, Germans, and Old Prussians were slowly melting into one nation, and as national differences disappeared, the common goals of all the ethnic and social groups of Prussia became more prominent, and the Prussian estates leaned increasingly towards Poland.

== Situation in 1450s ==
By 1410, an alliance of Poles and Lithuanians defeated the Order at the Battle of Grunwald (also called the Battle of Tannenberg). Within the decade, the future of the Order, and its incessant and barbarous actions with Poland and the Latvian, Lithuanian, and Livonian peasants, was debated at the Council of Constance (1415–1416). In 1452, the Prussian Confederation asked the Holy Roman Emperor Frederick III to mediate in their conflict with the Teutonic Order. Disagreeing with the confederacy, Frederick banned it and ordered it to obey the Teutonic Order on 5 December 1453.

Faced with that situation, the Prussians sent envoys to Poland—although the Prussian Confederation, under the influence of Thorn and the Pomeranian and Culmerland nobility, had already sought contact with the Poles. They received support, especially from Greater Poland and from the party of Queen Sophia of Halshany, mother of King Casimir IV Jagiellon of Poland. The Bishop of Kraków, Zbigniew Oleśnicki, opposed this support and tried to prevent war.

In January 1454, the year when Casimir IV was married to Elisabeth Habsburg, the Prussian faction asked Casimir IV to incorporate Prussia into the Kingdom of Poland. Casimir asked the Prussian Confederation for a more formal petition. On 4 February 1454, the Secret Council of the Prussian Confederation sent a formal act of disobedience to the Grand Master. Two days later the confederacy started its rebellion and soon almost all Prussia, except for Marienburg, Stuhm (Sztum), and Konitz (Chojnice), were free from Teutonic rule. Most of the captured Ordensburg castles were immediately destroyed.

== Situations in Konitz and Marienburg ==
In early 1454, the Grand Master Ludwig von Erlichshausen took refuge in Marienburg, as a defense against the incursion of the Prussian Confederacy and its ally, the King of Poland. From there, the Grand Marshal sent inquiries to the Order's allies throughout Europe for aid. On 27 February, the Poles and their allies from Danzig established a perimeter, complete with siege equipment, artillery, and several thousand troops. To prevent the town from being cut off from communication, the knights made constant sorties and at least once broke the lines of the besiegers, capturing the guns, supply trains, and about 300 prisoners. Despite initial problems, the Poles, who had received orders to follow up on the siege with vigor, continued in their efforts, effectively regrouping outside the city walls, and repulsing the small number of knights who made regular forays against them.

=== Assault at Konitz ===
Simultaneously, the Poles, commanded by Casimir himself, had also besieged Konitz with a sizable army: some reports suggest he had 12,000 cavalry and 40,000 infantry, but other sources suggest the Polish force was considerably smaller. No more than 15,000 knights of the Order, under command of Rudolf von Sagan, Count von Henneberg, and Henry von Lauterstein advanced toward Konitz to lift this siege. On 14 September 1454, they approached the Polish entrenchments unseen, then attacked. Surprised, most of the besiegers ran or were killed, leaving over 3,000 dead upon the field. The rout was so successful that the Knights and their allies were able to capture Casimir's entire train, which included war booty he had liberated from the Knights in previous forays.

=== Collapse of the Siege at Marienburg ===
News of the catastrophic Polish rout at Konitz caused chaos among the besiegers at Marienburg. The Prussian troops, upon being told that their former masters had, with a mere handful of men, overthrown and routed the most powerful army in the region, worried they would soon follow in this fate. (Note: Although the 12,000 men of the Order could hardly be considered a handful, Casimir had 52,000 at Konitz, leaving a battle field ratio of 1 soldier of the Order against 4+ Poles and their allies.) The outbreak of an epidemic made matters worse; the priests told the Prussians that the illness was retribution for their disobedience to the Order. The Prussians abandoned the Poles at the siege works before Marienburg, and fled in the night, leaving their baggage, all their equipment, and their arms. They fled to Prussian Holland and Culm.

== Aftermath ==
By late in the year, the Polish alliance with the Prussian Confederacy was in chaos. Abandoned by their allies, the Poles surrendered unconditionally at Stuhm, Saalfeld, Liebemühl, and Osterode. The prisoners were thrown into the dungeons of Marienburg, and the bodies of those who died there were thrown into the river.

With the collapse of the siege at Marienburg, and the surrender of the remaining Polish forces, the Bishop of Samland abandoned the Polish cause and, upon payment of money and treasure, plus the silver and plate of all his churches, he was pardoned. Regardless, the Order did not have sufficient funds to pay its mercenaries, and the Prussian and Polish forces who escaped continued their harassment of the Order's territories. Within the year of the collapse of the sieges at Marienburg and Konitz, Casimir brought 150,000 men across the Vistula river and continued with a stronger (and successful) assault on the Order.

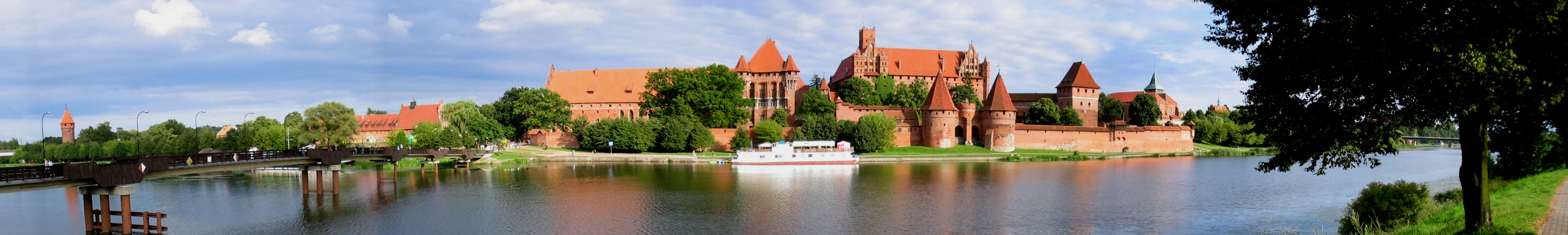

Panoramic image of Malbork (Marienburg) Castle from the northwestern bank of the river Nogat
