= Procurator (Teutonic Knights) =

Position in Monastic State of Prussia

The procurator or procurator general (Generalprokurator) of the Teutonic Knights was a position in their Monastic State of Prussia. The procurator was responsible for the court matters and administration of a specific region called a procuratoria, as well as commanding the army.

As a commander, the procurator had brothers of the Teutonic Knights and vassal Old Prussians at his disposal. Procurators were under the direct command of the komturs.

The Procurator had a fortified castle at Pień.
