= Polish–Teutonic Wars =

Military conflicts

Polish–Teutonic War may refer to:

- Polish–Teutonic War (1326–1332) over Pomerelia, concluded by the Treaty of Kalisz (1343)
- the Polish–Lithuanian–Teutonic War or Great War (1409–1411), ending the Lithuanian Crusade with the Peace of Thorn (1411)
- the Hunger War (1414) over the border in Samogitia
- the Gollub War (1422) over the border in Samogitia, ending with the Treaty of Melno
- Polish–Teutonic War (1431–1435), part of the Lithuanian Civil War
- Thirteen Years' War (1454–1466) or War of the Cities, a Polish-backed revolt of western Prussian cities against Teutonic rule
- War of the Priests (1467–1479), contesting the election of the Bishop of Warmia
- Polish–Teutonic War (1519–1521), known as Reiterkrieg in German, over the Knights' status as a Polish vassal

== See also ==
- List of wars involving Poland
- Polish–Ottoman Wars
- Polish–Russian Wars
- Polish–Swedish wars
