= Treaty of Melno =

1422 treaty ending the Gollub War

Coordinates: 53°25′56″N 18°59′15″E

Treaty of Lake Melno
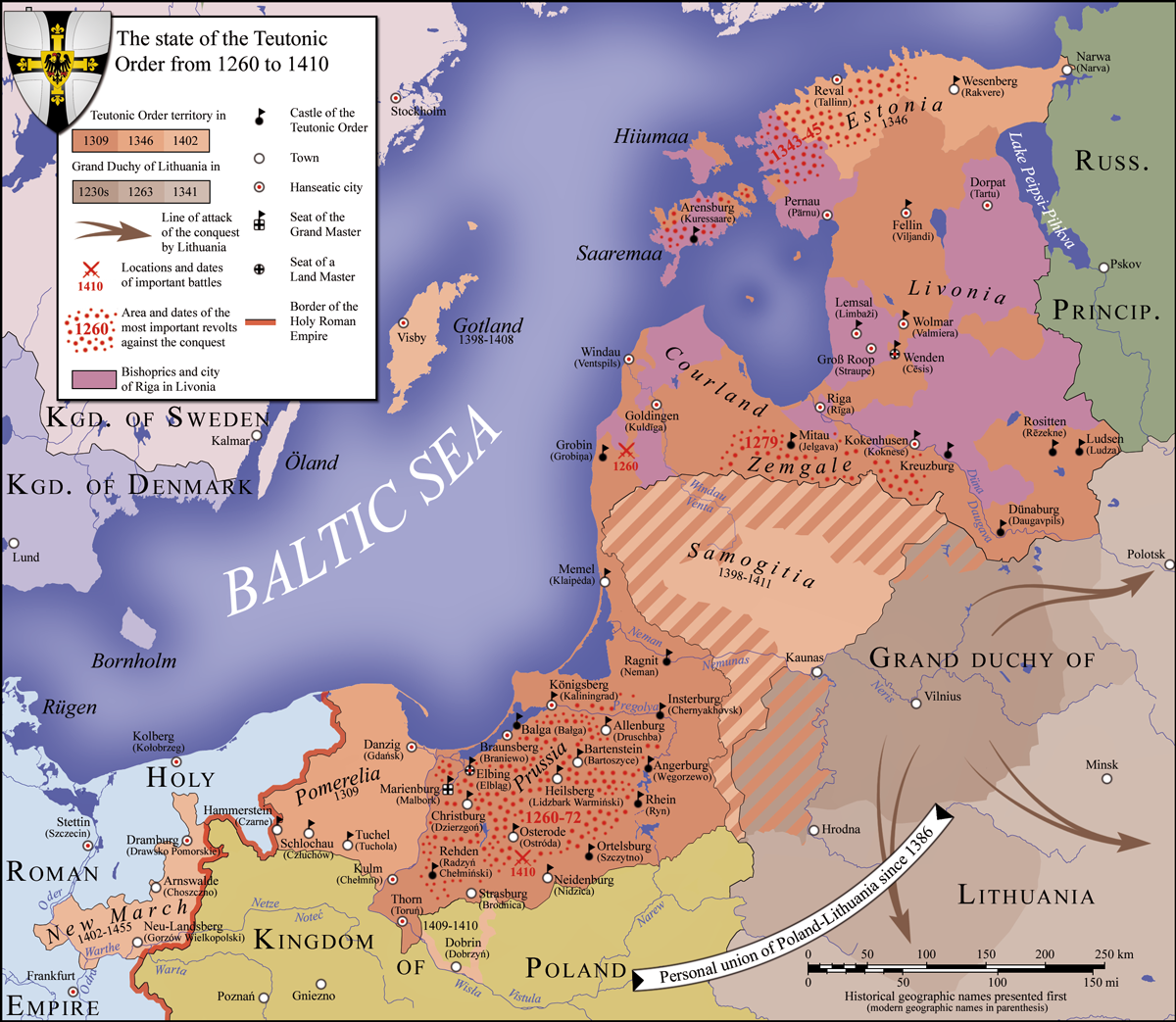
- Map of the State of the Teutonic Order between 1260 and 1410.
- Context: Gollub War
- Signed: 27 September 1422
- Location: Lake Melno
- Ratified: 9–18 May 1423
- Condition: Approval by Pope Martin V
- Parties: Teutonic Knights; Kingdom of Poland; Grand Duchy of Lithuania

The Treaty of Melno (Lithuanian: Melno taika; Polish: Pokój melneński) or Treaty of Lake Melno (German: Friede von Melnosee) was a peace treaty ending the Gollub War. It was signed on 27 September 1422, between the Teutonic Knights and an alliance of the Kingdom of Poland and the Grand Duchy of Lithuania at Lake Melno (German: Melnosee, Meldensee; Polish: Jezioro Mełno), east of Graudenz (Grudziądz). The treaty resolved territorial disputes between the Knights and Lithuania regarding Lithuania Minor and Samogitia, which had dragged on since 1382, and determined the Prussian–Lithuanian border, which afterwards remained unchanged for about 500 years. A portion of the original border survives as a portion of the modern border between the Republic of Lithuania and Kaliningrad Oblast, Russia, making it one of the oldest and most stable borders in Europe.

== Background ==
The First Peace of Thorn of 1411 did not resolve long-standing territorial disputes between the Teutonic Knights and the Polish–Lithuanian union. The peace transferred Samogitia to the Grand Duchy of Lithuania, but only for the lifetimes of Polish King Jogaila (Władysław II Jagiełło) and Lithuanian Grand Duke Vytautas. At the time both rulers were aged men. Soon disagreements arose as to the Samogitian borders: Vytautas claimed that the entire northern bank of the Neman River, including the port of Memel (Klaipėda), was Samogitian territory. The dispute was mediated at the Council of Constance and by Sigismund, Holy Roman Emperor. When Sigismund delivered an unfavorable judgment to the Lithuanians, Jogaila and Vytautas invaded the monastic state of the Teutonic Knights in July 1422, starting the Gollub War. The Teutonic Knights, led by Grand Master Paul von Rusdorf, were unable to mount a suitable defense. However Poland–Lithuania decided to end the conflict before reinforcements from the Holy Roman Empire could arrive through Farther Pomerania. A truce was signed on 17 September 1422. Each side named eight representatives, (Note: Teutonic Knights sent two Teutonic officers, Bishop of Ermland, Bishop of Pomesania, Livonian marshal, and three secular knights.) gave them full authority to negotiate, and sent them to the Polish Army camp near Lake Melno. The Treaty of Melno was concluded ten days later, on 27 September.

== Provisions ==
According to the terms of the treaty, the Teutonic Knights for the first time renounced all territorial, political, and missionary claims against the Grand Duchy of Lithuania. Samogitia was permanently ceded to Lithuania. The Prussian–Lithuanian border ran from sparsely inhabited wilderness in Suvalkija, through the triangle north of the Neman River, to Nemirseta on the Baltic Sea. Thus the Knights still controlled Neman's lower reaches and Memel (Klaipėda), an important seaport and trade center. Lithuania retained access to the Baltic Sea between the towns of Palanga (Polangen) (Note: According to the Bychowiec Chronicle, Birutė, mother of Lithuanian Grand Duke Vytautas, hailed from Palanga.) and Šventoji (Heiligen Aa) – a distance of about 15 kilometres (9.3 mi). However, Lithuania failed to develop harbors in Palanga or Šventoji as there was stiff competition with the nearby established ports of Memel and Libau (Liepāja) and unfavorable natural conditions. Thus it could not be considered a real access to the sea. For the Knights this short coastline strip was a major sacrifice as it separated the Teutonic Knights in Prussia from their branch in Livonia. The treaty is often described as a mutual Prussian–Lithuanian compromise. The Kingdom of Poland received Nieszawa and half of the Vistula channel from the mouth of the Drwęca River; in return Poland renounced any territorial claims to Pomerelia, Culmerland, and the Michelauer Land. The treaty also stipulated the demolition of the Teutonic Commander's Castle in Nieszawa. These results were described as a "disappointment" for Poland.

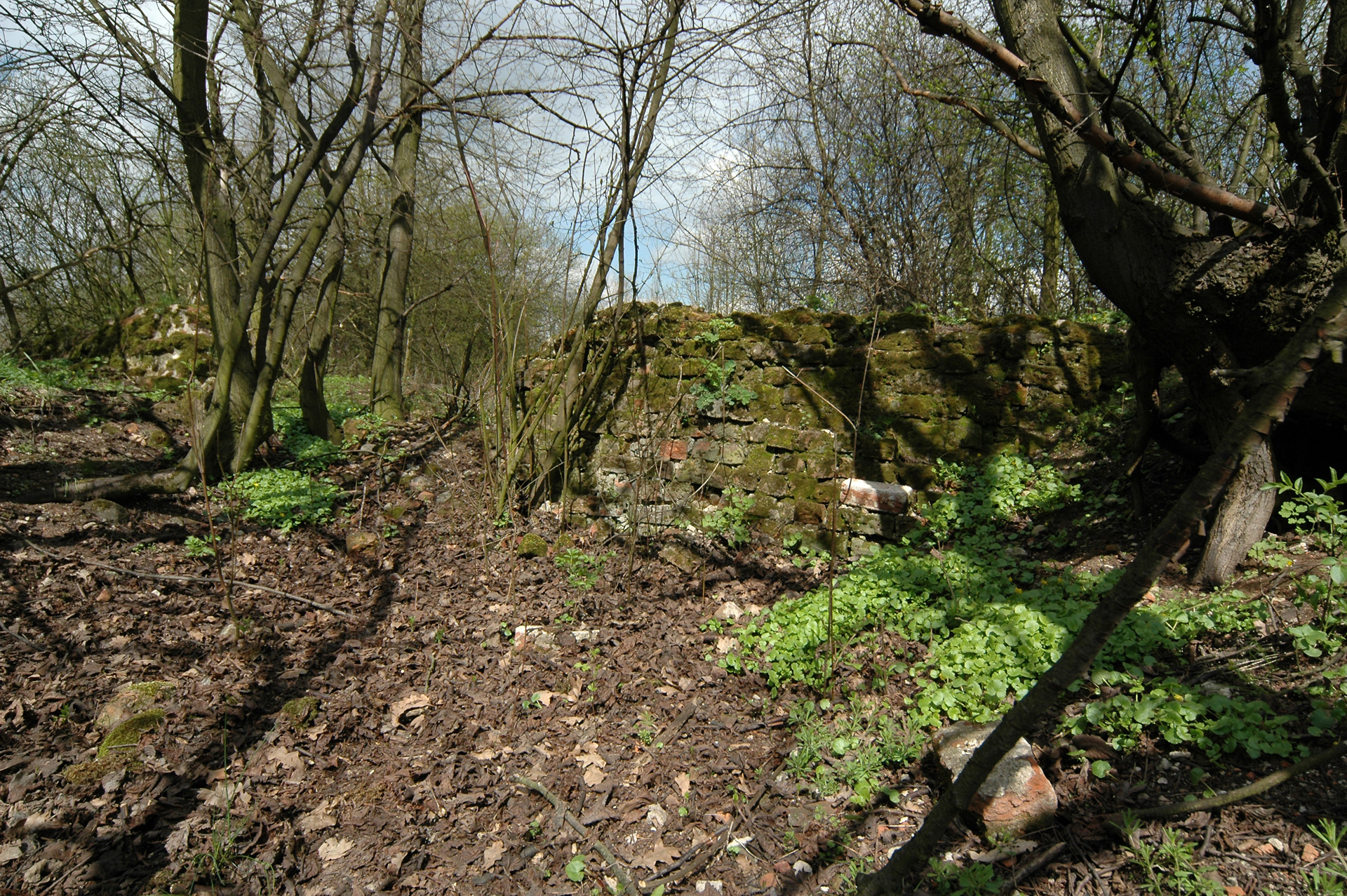
The Teutonic Commander's Castle in Nieszawa was demolished (slighted) as part of the terms of the peace treaty.

At the time of the treaty, the parties did not have their official seals and therefore it was not immediately ratified. Grand Master Rusdorf attempted to exploit the recess and renegotiate the treaty because his subjects were not satisfied with the terms. He hoped to wage a war with assistance from the Holy Roman Emperor. However, Sigismund and Jogaila met in Käsmark (Kežmarok) and agreed to an alliance: Sigismund would end his support to the Knights and Poland–Lithuania would stop their assistance to the Hussites in the Hussite Wars. This meant that Vytautas had to abandon his interventions in Bohemia. The agreement was signed on 30 March 1423. The Treaty of Melno was subsequently ratified on 9–18 May in Veliuona and approved by Pope Martin V on 10 July 1423. Poland–Lithuania affixed some 120 official seals to the treaty. The first Lithuanian signatories were voivode of Vilnius Albertas Manvydas, starosta of Vilnius Kristinas Astikas, voivode of Trakai Jonas Jaunius, elder of Samogitia Mykolas Skirgaila.

== Aftermath ==
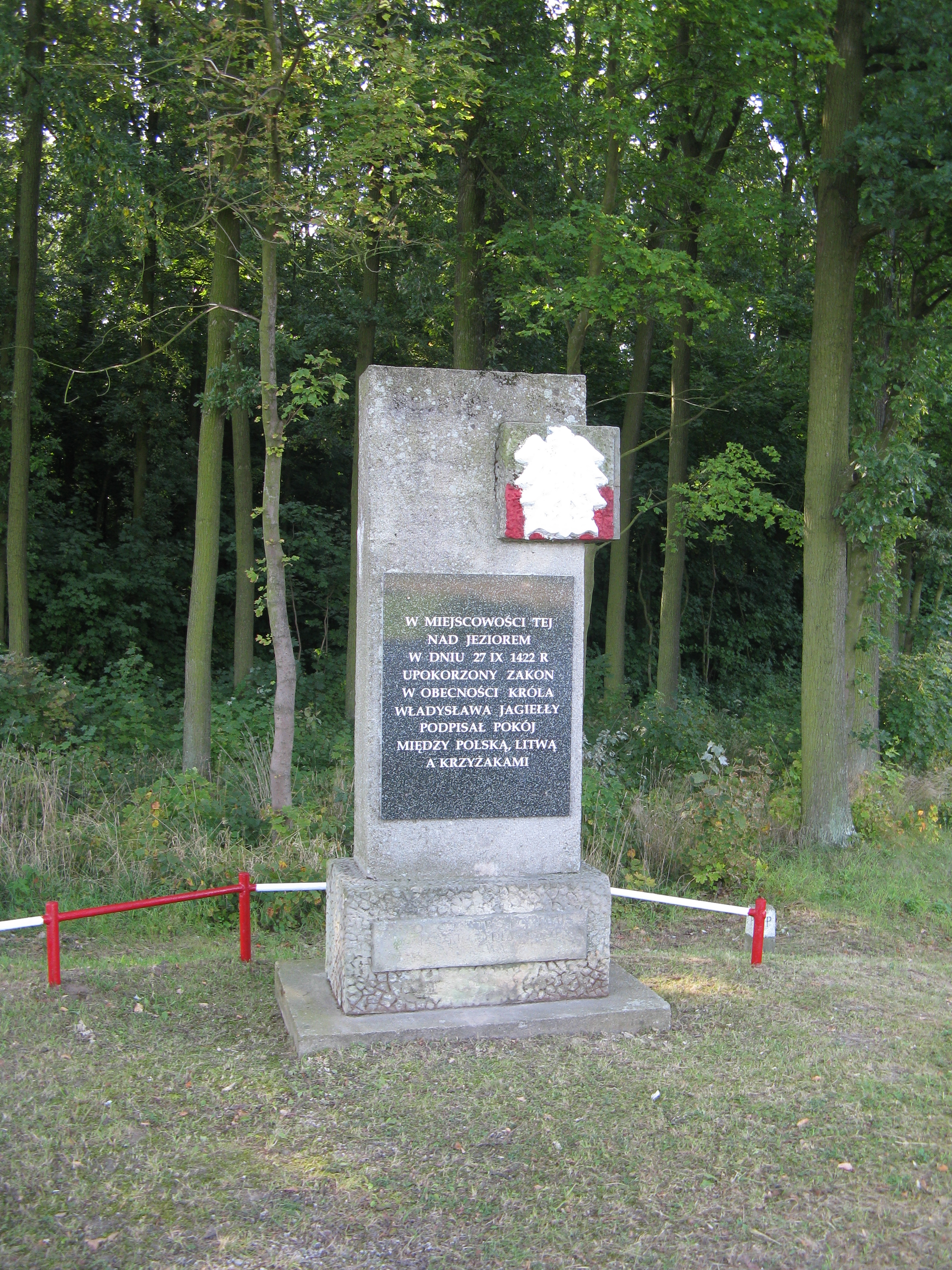
Monument commemorating the treaty in the village of Mełno, Poland

The treaty effectively ended warfare between the Teutonic Knights and the Grand Duchy of Lithuania, which had continued with brief interruptions since the 13th century. The last volunteer crusaders arrived in October 1422, after that the Knights had to rely on their own men or on mercenaries. It was a welcome development to Lithuania, as the treaty allowed it to direct its attention towards its Eastern territories and to internal reforms. War-devastated border regions in Samogitia and Suvalkija began to recover. However, the Polish–Teutonic disputes were not resolved. In a telling episode shortly after the treaty had been signed, the Knights and the Poles disputed a watermill in Lubicz, a strategic post which had been turned into a fortress. Vytautas was angered by the dispute and threatened to give up Palanga to the Knights if Poland did not surrender its claims to Lubicz. The Knights won this dispute.

The treaty put an effective end to the Polish–Lithuanian cooperation against the Knights. The Teutonic Knights attempted to befriend the Lithuanians, offering a royal crown to Vytautas in hopes of breaking up the Polish–Lithuanian union. During the Lithuanian Civil War (1431–1435), Lithuanian Duke Švitrigaila was able to employ the Polish–Teutonic animosity for his own advantages – the Knights invaded Poland, starting the Polish–Teutonic War. The two states battled again during the Thirteen Years' War (1454–66), a civil war that tore Prussia in half.

The agreement drew the Prussian–Lithuanian border roughly and imprecisely, resulting in local demarcation disputes. The border was redrawn with greater detail and precision in 1532 and 1545. The border survived without major changes until World War I. In 1919, the Treaty of Versailles detached the Klaipėda Region (Memel Territory) from Germany as a League of Nations mandate. Lithuania annexed the region in 1923. The southern portion of the border, with small modifications, still survives as the border between Lithuania and Kaliningrad Oblast, Russia.
