= Siege of Marienburg (1457–1460) =

Siege Of Malbork

- Part of the Thirteen Years' War (1454–1466)
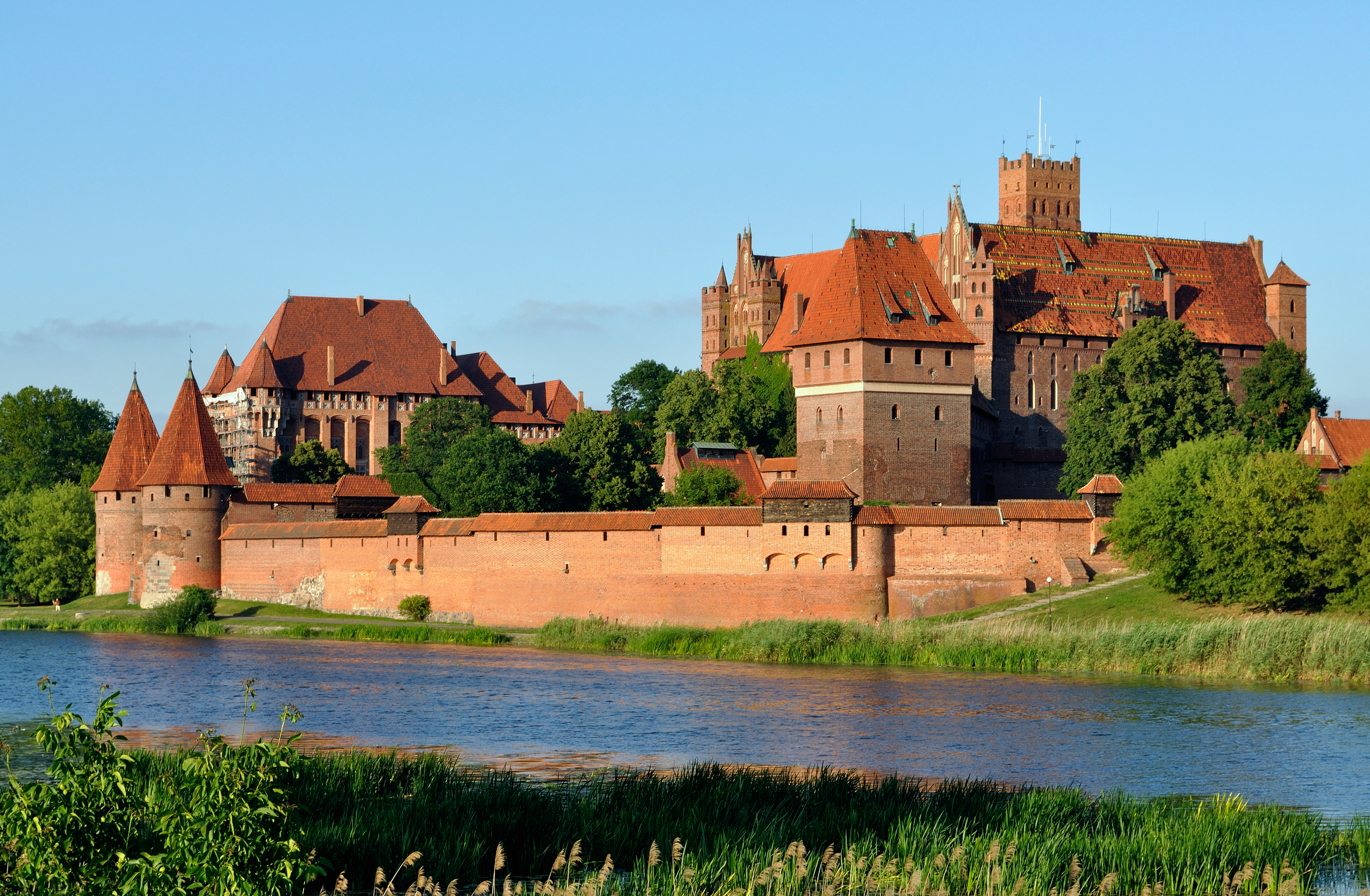
- Siege of Malbork (1457)
Date	September 28, 1457 – August 5, 1460
Location	Marienburg Castle (Malbork Castle) 54°02′23″N 19°01′40″E
Result	Polish victory

Belligerents
Kingdom of Poland	State of the Teutonic Order

Commanders and leaders
Casimir IV Jagiellon; Ulryk Czerwonka	Bernard Szumborski

The siege of Malbork took place between September 28, 1457 and August 5, 1460, during the Thirteen Years' War. The Teutonic Knights tried to regain the fortress (Ordensburg) of Malbork (or Marienburg), which had been the capital of their state, but was captured by the Kingdom of Poland in June 1457. The Knights, commanded by Bernard Szumborski, failed to do so, and Malbork remained in Polish hands, becoming the seat of Malbork Voivodeship.

== Background ==
In the spring of 1457, the garrison of Marienburg, composed of mercenaries (mostly from Bohemia), hired by the Teutonic Knights, began negotiations with Polish King Casimir IV Jagiellon. The mercenaries, who had not been paid by the Knights, agreed to sell three fortresses - Marienburg, Dirschau and Eylau. On June 7, 1457, Polish King entered Marienburg, and the capital of the State of the Teutonic Order was moved to Königsberg. The mercenaries, commanded by Olrich Cervonka, received 190 000 Hungarian florins.

== The siege ==
In August 1457, the Knights began an offensive, with the purpose of regaining their castles. In the Battle of Sępopole, the Polish pospolite ruszenie was defeated, and main Teutonic forces, commanded by Moravian mercenary, Bernard Szumborski, headed towards Marienburg. On September 28, residents of the town handed it back to the Knights, but the Marienburg Castle remained in Polish hands, defended by Czech mercenary Olrich Cervonka, who had switched sides.

In October 1457, the Knights and their mercenaries ransacked the areas held by Poles, capturing Chełmno and Starogard. After this raid, forces sent from Greater Poland appeared in the area of Marienburg, cutting all communications links between scattered Teutonic forces. Nevertheless, the siege of Marienburg continued through the winter, and following royal order, Olrich Cervonka was replaced by Scibor z Ponieca.

In the spring of 1458, Polish Sejm agreed to send levee en masse to Marienburg. Polish army was concentrated in June in Kujawy, reaching the castle on August 10. Numerous delays and lack of artillery prevented the Poles from breaking the siege, while the Knights on August 16 captured Neuenburg. In September the units of pospolite ruszenie began to head back to Poland, and in October, a 9-month truce was signed.

The truce ended in July 1459, and the Knights immediately resumed military activity. Marienburg was defended by Jan Koscielecki and Prandota Lubieszowski, while Polish King was unable to gather an army, due to never-ending arguments with the magnates. In November a 2-month truce was signed, and both sides began negotiations, in cooperation with foreign rulers.

== End of Siege ==
The negotiations strengthened the position of the Knights, as they were supported by Bohemian ruler George of Podebrady, who feared that Casimir IV Jagiellon would try to grab his throne. Under the circumstances, Poles decided to act, and on March 21, 1460, their army approached the city of Marienburg, which, unlike the castle, was in Teutonic hands. The city was cut off, traffic on the Nogat river was blocked, and on August 5, 1460, the city surrendered. The mayor of Marienburg was sentenced to death for treason.

== Bibliography ==
- Marian Biskup - Wojna trzynastoletnia i powrót Polski nad Bałtyk w XV wieku (Thirteen Year War and the return of Poland to the Baltics in the 15th century)
