= Malbork treaty =

1454 treaty with Teutonic Order mercenaries

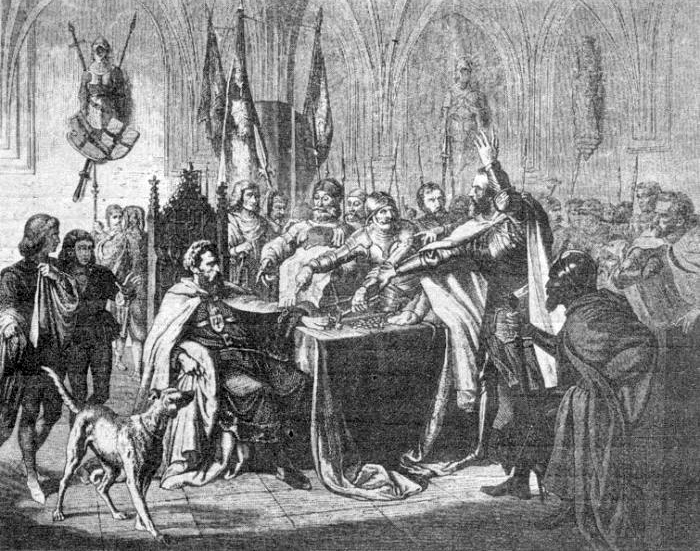
- Grand Master Ludwig von Erlichshausen's negotiations with the commanders of the mercenary army in the Malbork fortress.
- Context: Thirteen Years' War, lack of funds to pay mercenary troops
- Signed: 9 October 1454
- Location: Malbork
- Signatories: Ludwig von Erlichshausen; Bernard von Zinnenberg
- Parties: Teutonic Order; mercenaries

The Czech units, relying on field fortifications, repelled the attack of mounted knights – the new infantry tactics revolutionized the ways of waging wars in the 15th century.

Malbork treaty was signed on 9 October 1454, in the fortress of Marienburg (Malbork). It was between the authorities of the Teutonic Order, represented by the Grand Master Ludwig von Erlichshausen, and the commanders (rittmasters) of the mercenary troops fighting on behalf of the Order in the Thirteen Years' War, represented by Bernard von Zinnenberg (Bernard Szumborski). In exchange for obtaining a guarantee with the right to sell the most important Prussian strongholds still under the Order's control for unpaid military compensation, the mercenaries agreed to continue military operations on behalf of the Order until 19 February 1455, despite not receiving the agreed payment. This enabled the Teutonic Order to repel the Polish offensive on Malbork in January 1455, recapture Königsberg (Kaliningrad) along with Lower Prussia and Samland from the Prussian Confederation, and regain control of several fortresses from them.

The failure to meet the agreed payment deadline, as well as subsequent payment deadlines, led to the sale of the unconquered fortress in Malbork to the Kingdom of Poland by the mercenaries commanded by Oldrzych Czerwonka and Nikolai Welfersdorf on 6 June 1457, as well as the fortresses in Tczew and Iława on 13 June 1457.

== Origins of the treaty ==
=== Mercenary troops in the Thirteen Years' War ===
The rapid development of the uprising in Prussia, the disobedience to the Order's authorities by the cities belonging to the Prussian Confederation, and the fall of key fortresses in February 1454 caused panic among the Teutonic Knights – many of them left for Germany or fled to Malbork, without attempting to defend the Teutonic territories against the rebels.

The loss of control over the Prussian state and the lack of knights prevented the Grand Master from mobilizing the mass mobilization to defend the Order, forcing him to rely on mercenary forces for military actions.

The mercenaries mainly came from Germany and Bohemia. The Taborites, emigrating from Czech lands after the victory of the Utraquists in the Hussite Wars for fear of reprisals, were the precursors of the tactics of fighting with the use of mercenary infantry.

The superiority of the mercenaries' tactics was demonstrated in the turning point Battle of Chojnice on 18 September 1454 – the Teutonic army under the command of Bernard von Zinneberg defeated the undisciplined and outdated Polish mass mobilization led by Casimir IV, gained open access to the Prussian state and relief for Malbork, and undermined the position of the Kingdom of Poland in the Prussian states.

=== Bankruptcy of the Teutonic Order and the Kingdom of Poland ===
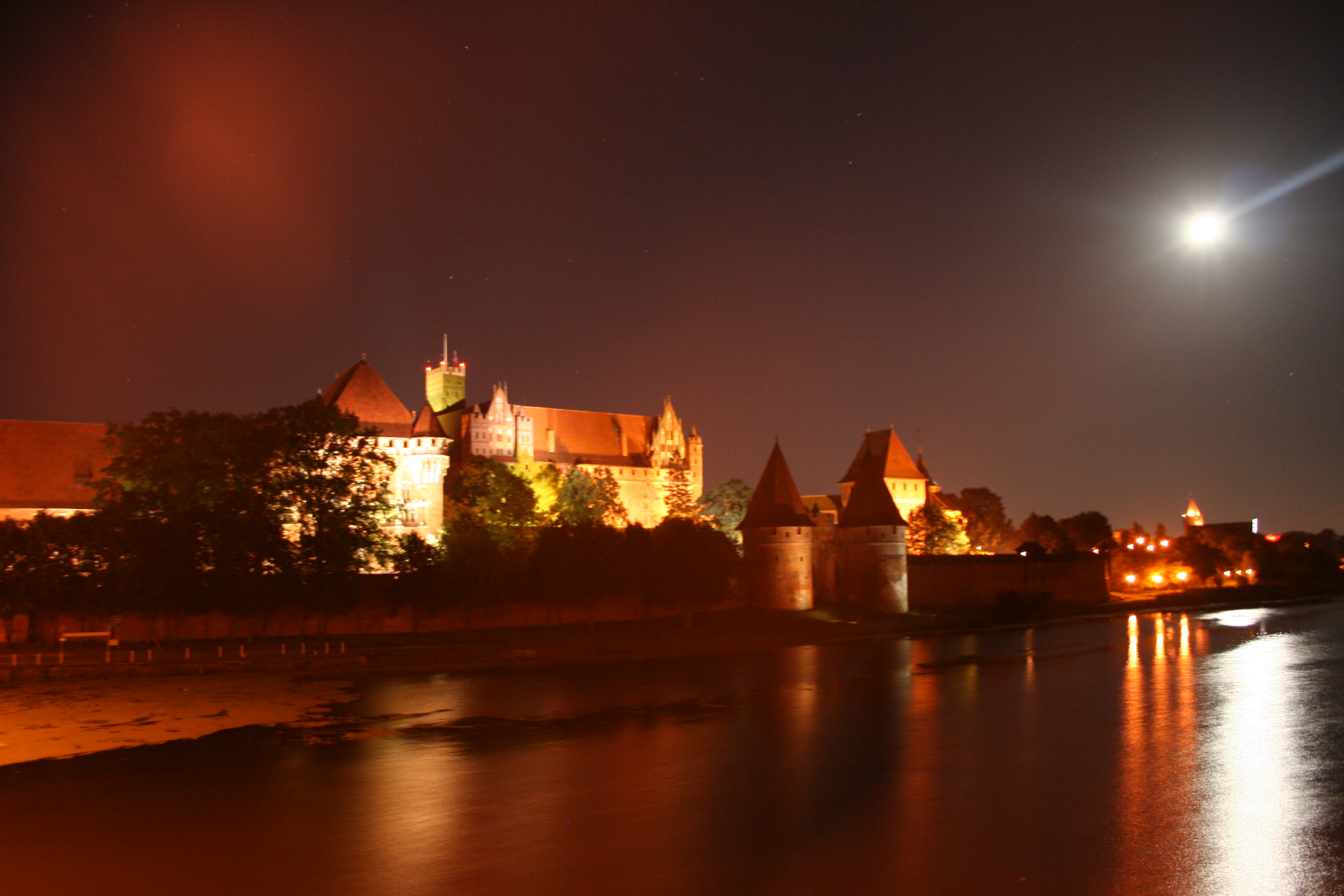
The fortress in Malbork at night. The unconquered capital of the Teutonic Order during the Thirteen Years' War was sold to Poland by German and Czech mercenaries.

The annual cost of hiring one mounted mercenary was 40 florins, while an infantry mercenary (trabant) cost half of that amount. The annual income of the Kingdom of Poland was around 90,000 florins. Due to loans for financing the Hungarian War (1440–1444) and the distribution of royal estates to nobles, the treasury of the Kingdom of Poland was depleted. In the critical situation of the royal treasury, larger expenditures depended on special taxes.

At the beginning of the Thirteen Years' War, the mercenary forces recruited by the Order were paid advance payments. Deprived of income from the 56 Prussian towns, which rebelled against the Grand Master or were seized by the insurgents in the spring of 1454, the Order was unable to promptly settle its debts to the mercenaries.

On 28 September 1454, the authorities of the Order admitted to the commanders of the mercenary units who arrived in Malbork that they did not have sufficient financial means to pay their wages. In response, individual mercenary units ceased active operations against the Prussian Confederation.

On 4 October 1454, the rittmasters Heinrich von Plauen (the younger) and Wit von Schönburg began negotiations with the Grand Master regarding the postponement of the mercenaries' payment deadline. On 7 October, the majority of the mercenary units set off towards Malbork, leaving a small detachment under the command of Oldrzych Czerwonka in Tczew. The mercenaries confiscated silver and church jewels as well as food in the Teutonic capital to cover their debts, causing provisioning difficulties for Malbork, but they did not obtain satisfaction for most of their claims.

== Conditions of the treaty ==
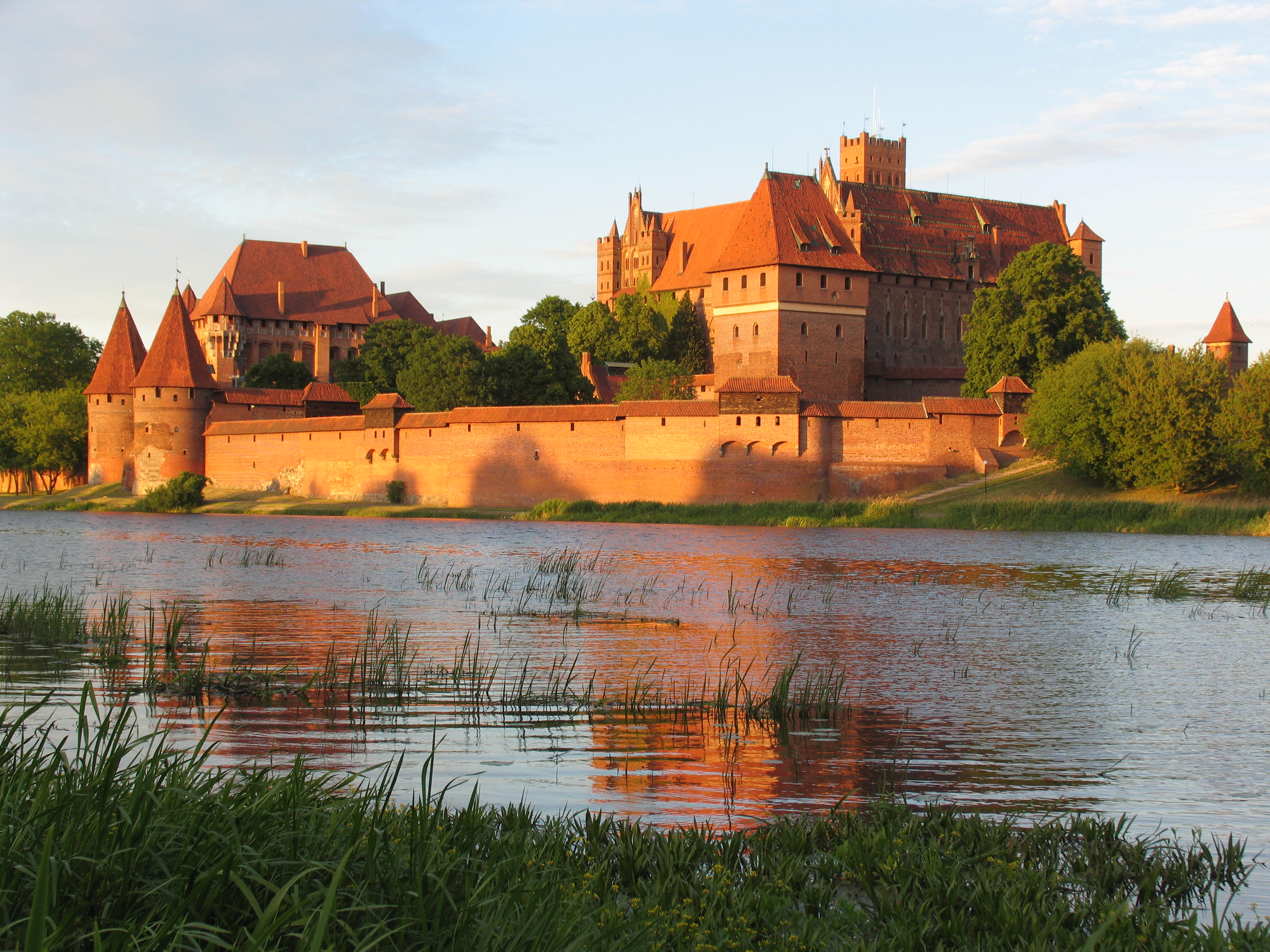
The Teutonic Order's fortress in Malbork – the location of the signing of the guarantee agreement between the Grand Master and the mercenaries.

On 9 October 1454, in Malbork, at the initiative of the Order's authorities, an agreement was reached between the Grand Master and the commanders of the mercenary units, represented by rittmasters Bernard von Zinnenberg, Adolf von Gleichen, and Hans von Monfort-Pfannenberg, regarding a guarantee agreement. According to its provisions, the rittmasters undertook to defend the fortresses and towns occupied by them against Poland and the Prussian Confederation and to continue serving the Order, leaving both the supreme authority (Herrschaft) over all towns and fortresses and the associated revenues to the Teutonic Order. In return, the Order imposed on the districts maintaining the garrisons of mercenaries the obligation to provide ongoing maintenance for the garrisons and fodder for the horses, and undertook to repay all debts to the mercenaries by 19 February 1455. In the event of failure to meet the deadline, the Order was forced to hand over to the mercenaries all towns occupied by them, along with the population, and fortresses with the captives held there for ransom, with the right to sell them to satisfy their claims.

The model for such a constructed treaty was ultimately the unfulfilled treaty of 1447 between Duke William III and the mercenary forces regarding the pledge of pay on the fortresses in Thuringia.

Overall, this treaty was advantageous for the Order because it allowed the Grand Master to continue military operations with the intention of recapturing the Prussian towns and paying off the mercenaries, while also protecting the Order from separate claims made by individual mercenary units. Its drawbacks could only be revealed by the failure to fulfill the treaty within the specified time frame, about which the Order undertook to inform the mercenaries with a one-month notice.

== Execution of the treaty ==
=== War on credit ===
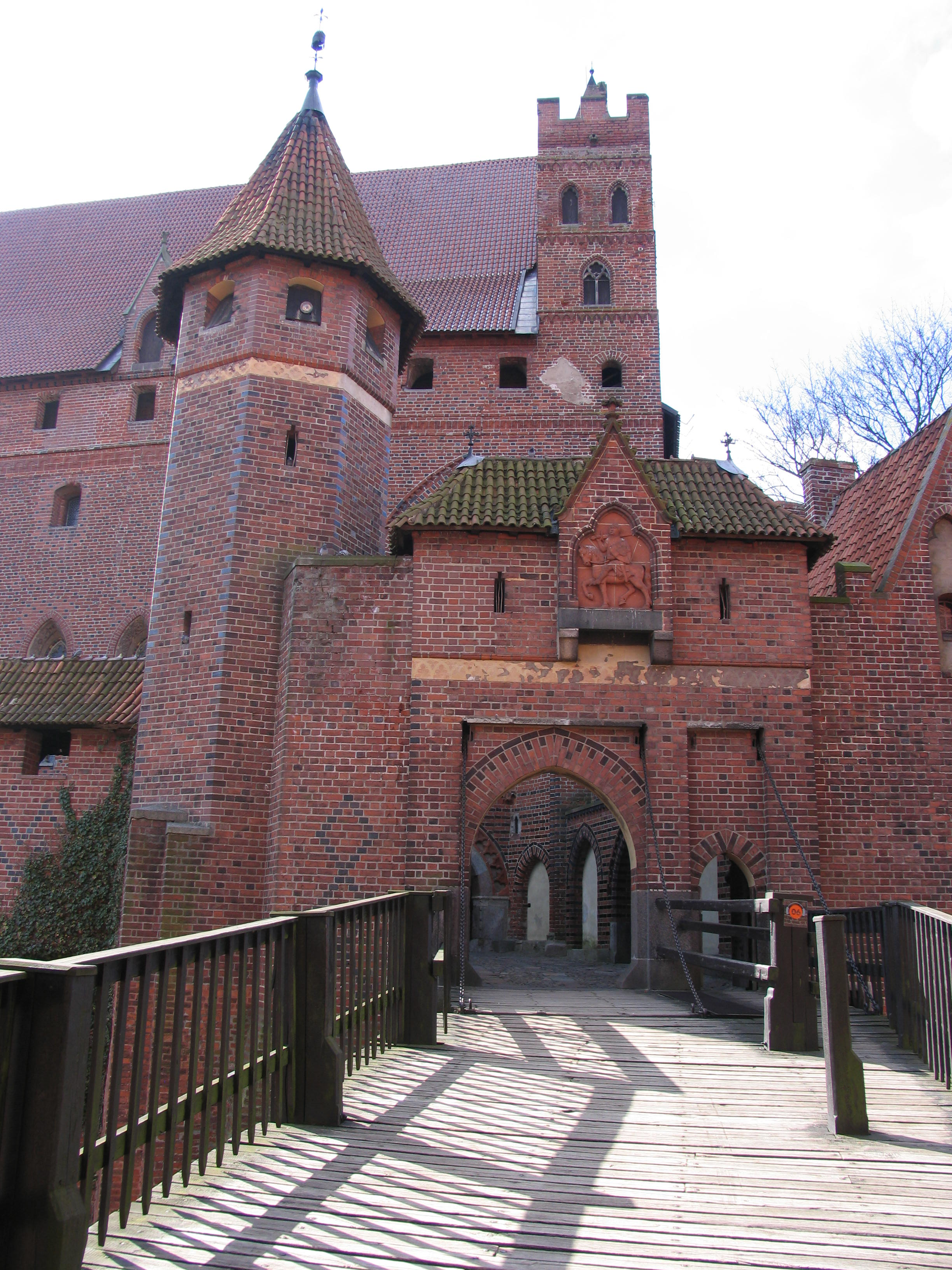
The Teutonic Order's fortifications in Malbork. The fortress acquired in 1457 by the Kingdom of Poland from the mercenaries remained until the end of the 16th century one of the three strongest fortresses in Poland.

In the first months after the signing of the Malbork treaty, the military actions conducted on credit brought significant successes to the Teutonic Order: temporary disruption of communication along the Vistula between Poland and Gdańsk and the Lower Prussia, as well as the recapture of several towns and fortresses back to the side of the Order. However, further vigorous actions were necessary due to the failure to recapture any major urban centers and the associated income, as well as the wavering stance of Lower and Upper Prussia. In the winter of 1454, the Teutonic Order managed to seize a number of fortresses forming a barrier securing Malbork and the Vistula crossings, and in January 1455, they repelled the offensive launched by the Kingdom of Poland with the forces of the peasant militia from Lesser Poland.

Attempts to restore the authority of the Grand Master over Gdańsk, which repelled the Teutonic attack on 13 January 1455, and Toruń, which suppressed the pro-Teutonic conspiracy of the burghers on 13 March 1455, failed.

Only in March 1455, due to the pro-Teutonic revolt of the burghers in two out of three districts of the capital of Lower Prussia, Königsberg, did the city pass to the side of the Grand Master. The loyalty of the port district of Kneiphof to the Prussian Confederation forced the Teutonic authorities to organize an expedition aimed at ultimately capturing Königsberg and reclaiming Lower Prussia and Sambia. Actions against Kneiphof and the Confederate relief for the city lasted until July 1455.

By the end of April 1455, the unpaid obligations of the Teutonic Order to the mercenaries exceeded 400,000 florins.

=== Mercenary rebellion ===
On 23 April 1455, the Grand Master once again failed to meet the deadline for paying the Teutonic soldiers' wages, and as a result, the mutinous mercenaries under Czerwonka's command seized control of the fortresses in Malbork, Tczew, Sztum, Gniew, and Iława on 2 May 1455, forcibly asserting their rights as rulers. Grand Master von Erlichshausen became a hostage in his own capital, and deprived of control over Malbork and the revenues from the castle district, he could not support the ongoing siege of the port district of Königsberg – Kneiphof, which had begun in April 1455. The commander of the Teutonic forces near Königsberg, Heinrich von Plauen of Elbląg, was forced to allocate the newly collected taxes from Lower Prussia to his soldiers, deepening the crisis of the Grand Master. Von Erlichshausen could also not count on assistance from the uninvolved in the mortgage agreements Duke of Silesia, Balthasar of Żagań, who, on 16 June 1455, led his own mercenaries and garrisons from nearby fortresses, totaling 932 cavalrymen and 571 trabants, to leave Malbork and reinforce the siege of Kneiphof.

=== Prognosis ===
In the summer of 1455, the Prussian Confederation and the Kingdom of Poland began negotiations with the mercenaries for the redemption of captured fortresses. Due to the bankruptcy of both sides of the conflict and the repulsion of another expedition of the Polish mass mobilization in the fall of 1455, the Czech and German commanders of the mercenaries, who had the greatest military strength in Prussia, became the masters of the situation and made extravagant demands.

During the negotiations, the mercenary rittmasters failed to maintain a unified stance. For the Polish side, the most important point of negotiation was to establish the terms of the purchase of the fortress in Malbork, and the potential purchase of other fortresses was of secondary importance. The Czech mercenary rittmasters led the proponents of making a deal with the Kingdom of Poland, although they represented only one-third of the mercenaries participating in the treaty. The German proponents of selling the fortresses to Poland were led by the mercenary Mikołaj Welfersdorf.

In December 1455, the negotiating situation of the parties became complicated when, after rejecting the initial proposals of the mercenaries, the Polish side broke off negotiations, and the mercenaries offered the fortresses they held to any potential buyer – especially to Livonia, Denmark, Brandenburg, and to the exiled King of Sweden, Charles VIII. However, they rejected the unfavorable proposal of the Livonians (the Livonian branch of the Teutonic Order) to hand over the fortress in Marienburg (Malbork) for 100,000 florins and a promise to pay another 100,000 florins at a later date.

In June 1456, the leader of the mercenaries, Czerwonka, proposed to the Kingdom of Poland the sale of 21 fortresses in exchange for 463,794 florins, representing the overdue military pay and compensation for lost horses and weapons. Finally, on 29 July 1456, a treaty was signed in Toruń – the mercenaries undertook to sell the fortresses in exchange for 436,000 florins and agreed to receive ¼ of the agreed price in goods.

The Grand Hospitaller von Plauen and treaty supporter von Zinnenberg proposed better terms for the mercenaries, and on 14 August 1456, a treaty was signed in Prabuty – the garrisons of most fortresses renounced the Toruń treaty, surrendering 15 fortresses to the Teutonic Order in exchange for the obligation to repay debts by November 1456 and favorable terms of further service.

The supporters of the Toruń treaty occupying the fortress in Gniew sparked a revolt against the fortress command, but it was suppressed by mercenaries loyal to the Order, and the group opting to sell the fortress was forced to leave and went to Malbork. The fortresses, embroiled in internal conflicts, were unable to engage in any activity, and land military operations came to a halt.

=== Sale of Prussian fortresses ===
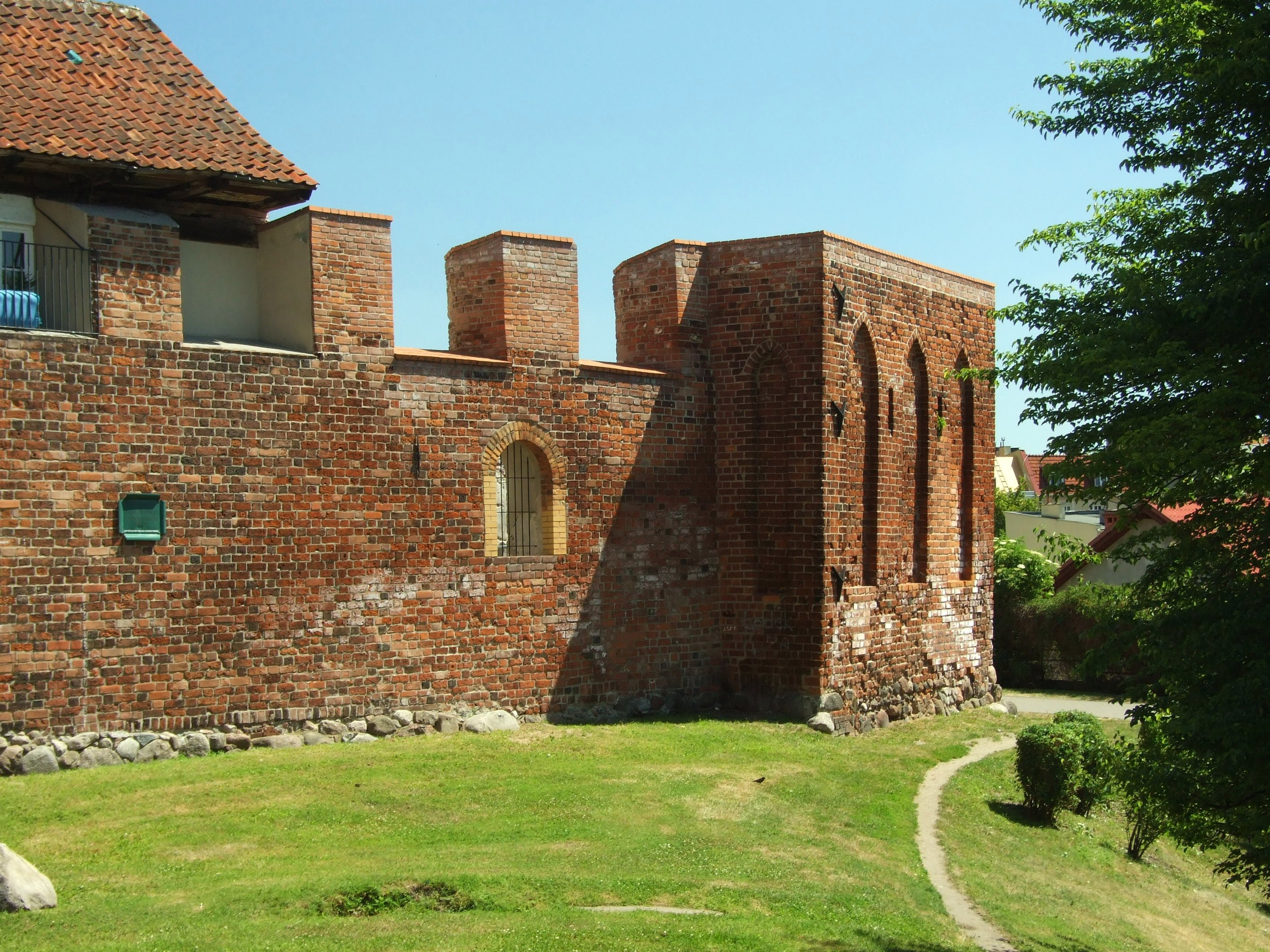
The defensive walls of Tczew, one of the fortresses purchased by the Kingdom of Poland and the Prussian Confederation from the Teutonic mercenaries. Tczew remained in Polish hands until the end of the war.

On 16 August 1456, Czerwonka, on behalf of the garrisons of Malbork, Tczew, Iława, Chojnice, Czarne, and Debrzno, concluded a new treaty with the Prussian Confederation and the Kingdom of Poland regarding the sale of six fortresses. However, still in the same month, the Teutonic Order managed to pay advances to the mercenaries occupying Debrzno, Chojnice, and Czarne. As a result, these garrisons withdrew from the treaty of 16 August 1456. Both sides of the conflict began to accumulate the agreed sums.

The intensive accumulation of funds for the redemption of fortresses through tax increases sparked rebellions of the commoners in Gdańsk and Toruń. Despite the support of these disturbances by the Teutonic Order, the city councils of the Prussian Confederation cities managed to maintain power and suppress the rebellions with the help of royal mercenaries.

A significant portion of the funds necessary for the purchase of fortresses was borrowed by the city of Gdańsk in exchange for granting the city a special privileges.

Under the modified treaty, which was agreed upon in the spring of 1457, the mercenaries sold the fortresses in Malbork, Tczew, and Iława to the Kingdom of Poland for a total amount of 190,000 florins. On 6 June 1457, after the payment of the final installment, the Kingdom of Poland took over the capital of the Teutonic state – Malbork, along with the fortress, and on 13 June 1457, Tczew and Iława.

== Consequences of the treaty ==
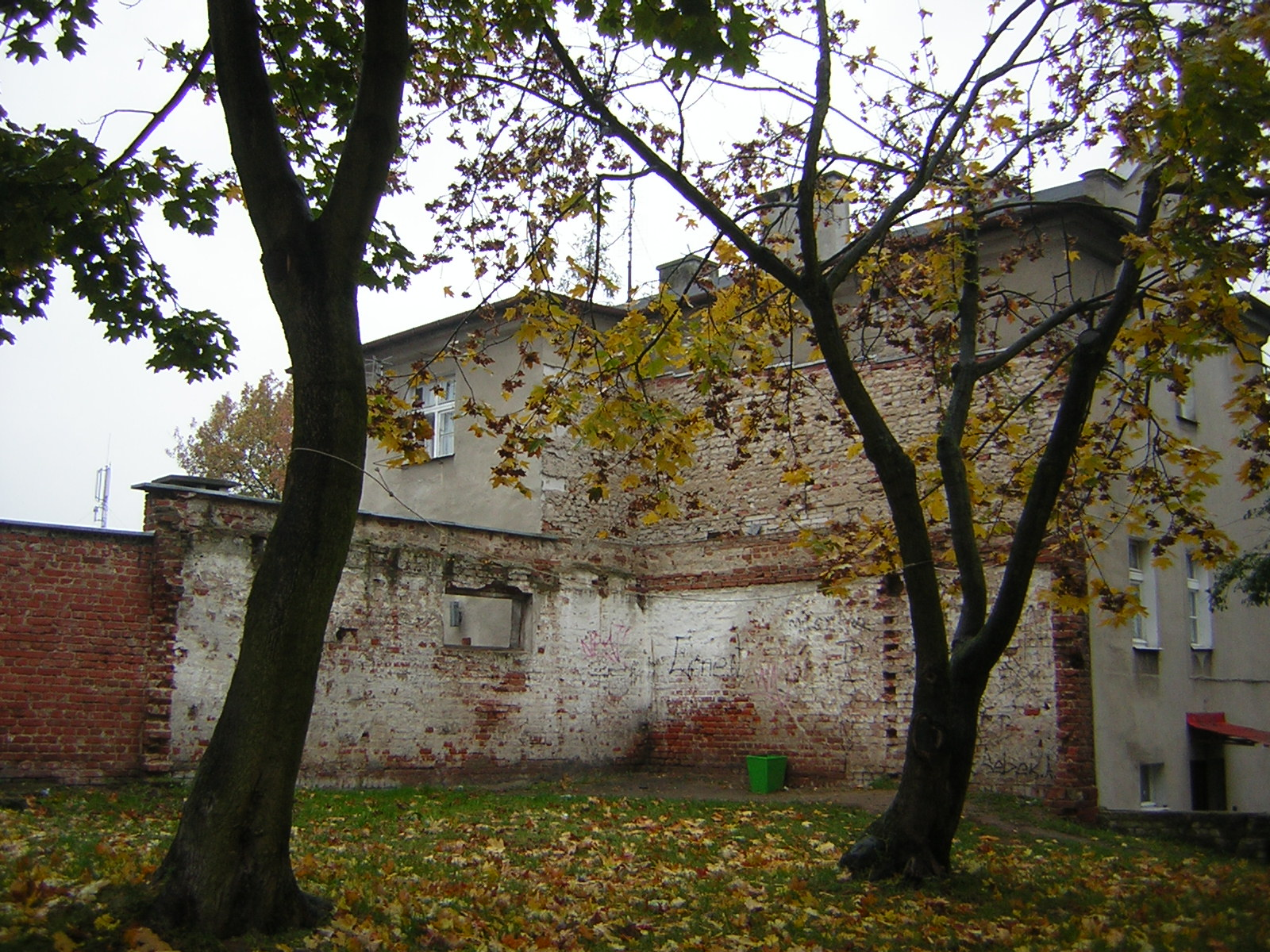
Remains of the medieval city walls of Iława. The city, sold by mercenaries to the Kingdom of Poland along with Tczew and Malbork, returned to the control of the Teutonic Order in October 1457 due to the actions of the pro-Teutonic faction.

On 8 June 1457, Casimir IV entered the castle in Malbork ceremoniously, and the feudal homage on behalf of the city of Malbork was paid to him by Mayor Bartłomiej Blume. The king also regained the banners lost at Chojnice. Ludwig von Erlichshausen fled to Chojnice.

Subsequently, in July 1457, an attempt to control the entire navigable route of the Vistula by capturing the fortified Gniew, defended by Fritz Raweneck, did not succeed – the besieging forces commanded by Prandota Lubieszowski were forced to retreat on 22 September 1457. At the same time, Grand Master von Erlichshausen secretly made his way to Königsberg, which he made the new capital of the Teutonic state and the main bastion of further resistance.

On 28 September 1457, due to betrayal from the pro-Teutonic faction in Malbork, led by Bartłomiej Blume, Teutonic forces took control of the city and began to assault the fortress, initiating the Siege of Marienburg. After the removal of the Polish garrison from Iława on 1 October 1457, the inhabitants overthrew the pro-Polish authorities of the city and, after reaching agreements with the Teutonic castellan Urlich von Kinsberg, restored the authority of the Order.

Oldrzych Czerwonka, in exchange for siding with King Casimir IV and handing over the fortress in Malbork, was rewarded with the grant of three starostwos and appointed as the starosta of Malbork. Under his pressure, Bernard von Zinnenberg, who had been captured at Chojnice, was eventually released from Polish captivity.

In March 1460, Czerwonka was tried in Prague before the royal court, presided over by the regent George of Poděbrady, for treason and unbecoming conduct of a soldier, and was imprisoned. The accuser was also a subject of the Czech lands, Bernard von Zinnenberg.

== In culture ==
The sale of the fortress in Malbork by mercenary forces is mentioned in Stefan Żeromski's novel Wiatr od morza in the chapter Bitwa pod Świecinem, described as "treachery that struck the Order on the head". The seizure of Malbork by the Kingdom of Poland is mentioned in the last chapter (LII) of Henryk Sienkiewicz's novel The Knights of the Cross, described as "a fortunate moment".

== Bibliography ==
- Jasienica, Paweł (1992). Polska Jagiellonów. ISBN 83-06-01796-X.
- Biskup, Marian (2014). Trzynastoletnia wojna z Zakonem Krzyżackim. Oświęcim. ISBN 978-83-7889-288-5.
- Baczkowski, Krzysztof (1999). Dzieje Polski późnośredniowiecznej (1370–1506). Vol. 3. Cracow. ISBN 83-85719-40-7.
- Dyskant, Józef Wiesław (2009). Zatoka Świeża 1463. Warsaw. ISBN 978-83-11-11571-2.
- Biskup, Marian (1990). Wojna trzynastoletnia i powrót Polski nad Bałtyk w XV wieku. ISBN 83-03-03076-0.
