= Królewiec Voivodeship =

1454–1466 voivodeship of Poland

- Voivodeship of the Kingdom of Poland
- 1454–1466
- Capital: Królewiec (de facto 1454–1455; de jure 1454–1466); Knipawa (de facto 1455) none (de facto 1455–1466)
- Government
- Voivode
  - 1454–1455: Ścibor Bażyński
- History
  - Established: April 1454
  - Capitulation of Knipawa: 14 February 1455
  - Second Peace of Thorn: 19 October 1466
- Contained within
  - Country: Crown of the Kingdom of Poland
Preceded by	Succeeded by
State of the Teutonic Order	State of the Teutonic Order

The Królewiec Voivodeship (Note: Polish: Województwo królewieckie; Latin: Palatinatus Kinsbergensis; German: Woiwodschaft Königsberg) was a short-lived voivodeship of the Crown of the Kingdom of Poland, with capital in the city of Königsberg (Polish: Królewiec, now Kaliningrad, Russia), that existed during the Thirteen Years' War. It was established by king Casimir IV Jagiellon in April 1454, following the incorporation of the city and the surrounding area into Poland, from the territory of the State of the Teutonic Order. Following the capitulation of Polish forces in the battle of Kneiphof, on 14 February 1455, the voivodeship fell under the control of the Teutonic forces. The voivodeship formally ceased to exist following the signing of the Second Peace of Thorn, on 19 October 1466, which affirmed its area under the ownership of the State of the Teutonic Order, as a part and fief of Poland.

== Government ==
The region was governed by the voivode. The only voivode of the voivodeship Ścibor Bażyński, who was in the office from April 1454 to 1455. The last mention of Ścibor, that refers to him as the voivode of Królewiec, comes from 12 April 1455. Due to the ongoing fighting in the region during the Thirteen Years' War, and later its occupation, the voivodeship did not have an organized administration, nor appointed the new voivode after 1455.
