= Battle of Bornholm (1460) =

Naval battle during the Thirteen Years' War

Second Battle of Bornholm
- Part of Thirteen Years' War
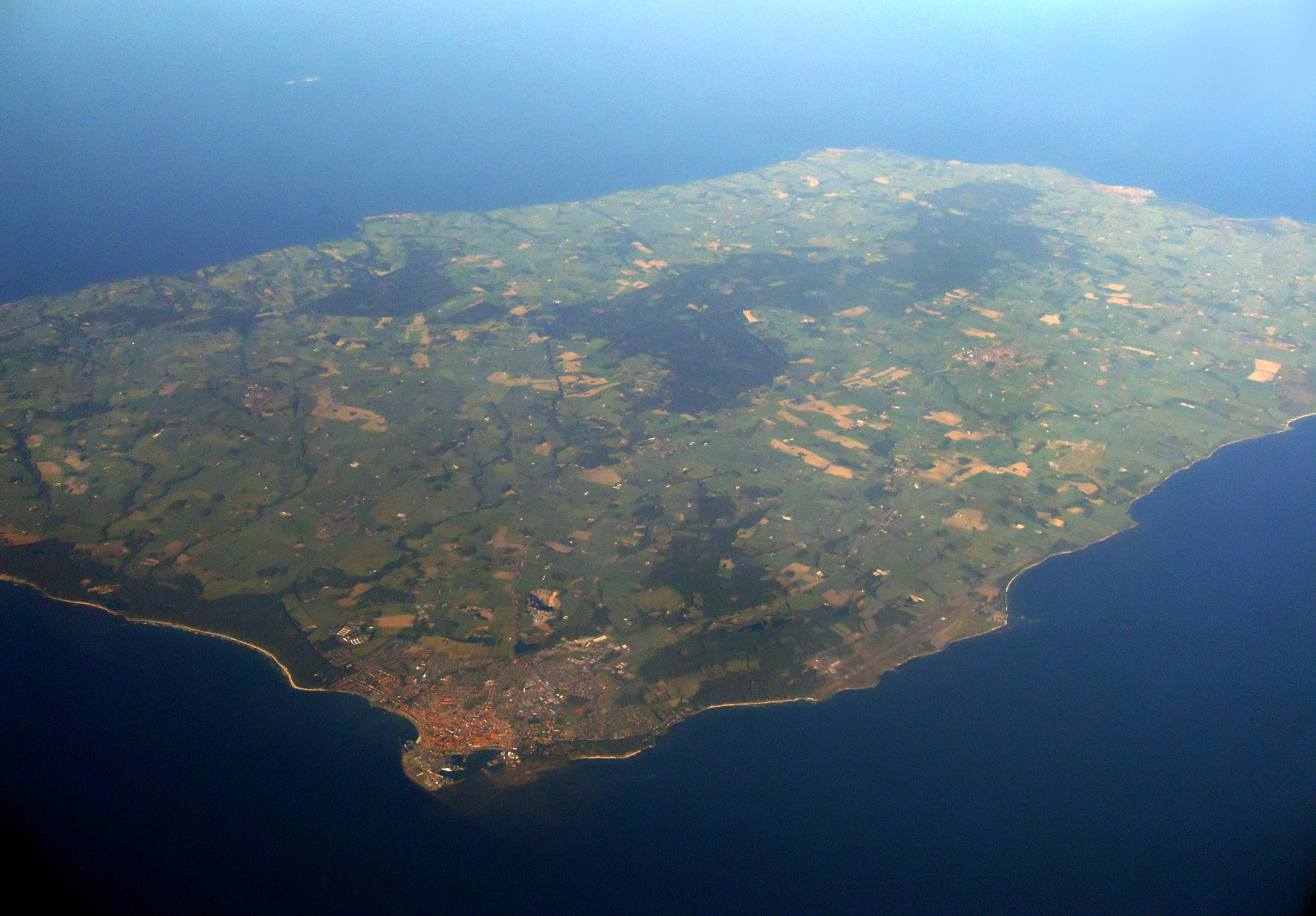
- Bornholm island
Date	8 July 1460
Location	off the coast of Bornholm
Result	Decisive victory for the Prussian Confederation fleet

Belligerents
Prussian Confederation, including: Gdańsk fleet	Teutonic Order

Commanders and leaders
Szymon Lubbelow	

Strength
1 ship 70 armed men	3 ships 120 armed men

Casualties and losses
Unknown	20 killed 100 captured 3 ships captured

The Second Battle of Bornholm was a naval engagement between a privateer ship of the Prussian Confederation and a small privateer fleet of the Teutonic Order on 8 July 1460 near the island of Bornholm during the Thirteen Years' War (1454–1466). It ended with the capture of the Teutonic ships by the Confederation vessel.

As a result of the armistice concluded between the Kingdom of Poland and the Danish Realm on 28 July 1458, the Teutonic Order was deprived of assistance from its only ally actively participating in the war. The lack of its own fleet prevented the Teutonic Knights from both blockading sea routes to counter the profitable trade of Prussian cities allied with Poland and protecting supplies to ports under Order control from Confederation privateers. The Teutonic Order attempted to create its own privateer fleet with assistance from Amsterdam, but its core was captured by a Prussian Confederation privateer ship commanded by Szymon Lubbelow on 8 July 1460 near the strategically located island of Bornholm at the intersection of transport routes. As a consequence of the battle and its aftermath, the Teutonic Order lost all its privateer ships, which collapsed Grand Master Ludwig von Erlichshausen's attempt to build its own fleet and ended armed operations on the Baltic Sea during the Thirteen Years' War.

== Background ==
The armistice concluded between the Kingdom of Poland and the Danish Realm on 28 July 1458 deprived the Teutonic Order of its main ally in the Thirteen Years' War. At the same time, the absence of a dedicated fleet left the Teutonic Knights unable to interrupt the lucrative maritime trade conducted by the Prussian Confederation cities opposing them or to protect supply routes to the Baltic ports under Order control, namely Memel and Königsberg.

In response, the Teutonic Order sought to establish its own privateer force. This initiative relied on anticipated assistance from the city of Amsterdam, whose merchants maintained commercial interests with the Order's territories, and included the issuance of letters of marque to private captains. In practice, however, substantial support from Amsterdam did not materialise.

Efforts to assemble the fleet under Grand Master Ludwig von Erlichshausen faced significant obstacles. Most experienced naval commanders had already been engaged by the Prussian Confederation, and attempts to recruit them to the Teutonic side met with limited success. Consequently, only a modest number of vessels were able to commence operations against Confederation shipping on Baltic routes.

== Objectives and methods of naval warfare during the Thirteen Years' War ==
=== Tasks of the Baltic fleets ===
The Thirteen Years' War occurred during a period of limited development in naval warfare within the Baltic Sea region. The states of the Baltic littoral, still weakened by the effects of earlier feudal fragmentation, generally lacked the organisational and financial capacity to maintain naval fleets capable of exerting a decisive influence in armed conflicts. In late medieval Europe, sustained efforts to develop such fleets were undertaken mainly by the monarchies of England and France.

From the second half of the 13th century onward, naval operations in the Baltic and North Seas were predominantly conducted by small fleets financed and equipped by major port cities. These forces were oriented primarily toward economic objectives rather than state-directed military strategy. Their main functions encompassed the protection of municipal trade routes to preserve commercial profits, the disruption of competitors' maritime communications through interference and coastal blockades, and the suppression of piracy. The sea transport of troops and direct assaults on enemy coastal territories remained rare, while naval activities in wartime were consistently subordinated to operations on land.

==== Privateer system of fleet mobilization ====
The absence of standing fleets compelled the belligerents to rely on the privateer system, in which armed naval forces were drawn from privately owned vessels mobilized through hire or requisition. The term "privateer" (German: Kaper), derived from the Frisian kapen (Low German: kapern, meaning "to seize" or "to capture"), gradually supplanted the earlier Baltic coastal designation uthliger (or auslieger), originally referring to a guard ship stationed at a port entrance. Mobilized vessels received a letter of marque from the issuing city council or ruler, authorizing attacks on enemy warships and merchant shipping bound for hostile ports, while confirming that the privateer operated on behalf of one of the warring parties. Prior to the commencement of each sailing season, authorities notified – through diplomatic representatives – ports seeking continued trade with their side of the prohibition on commerce with the enemy, as well as the deployment of privateers to enforce blockades of communication routes and coastlines. Privateer captains were furnished with detailed instructions outlining the objectives of their cruises.

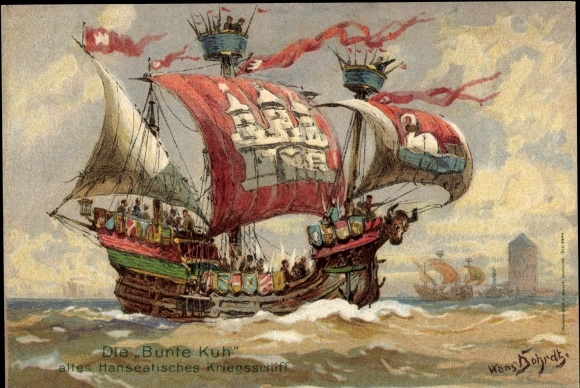
Hanseatic "peace cog" (ship intended to combat piracy) "Colorful Cow" in a painting by 20th-century German artist

The privateer system offered significant advantages, primarily by shifting the financial burden of naval mobilization away from the issuing authority. Crews and commanders were compensated through shares of captured prizes rather than fixed wages, and the practice eliminated the need for costly purpose-built warships.

However, discipline among privateer captains and crews was frequently low, as their primary motivation was financial gain rather than strategic wartime goals. The heterogeneous composition of privateer flotillas – in terms of vessel types and crew proficiency – further reduced operational effectiveness. Moreover, undisciplined privateers often violated instructions by seizing neutral shipping, thereby provoking diplomatic incidents.

=== Types of ships ===
Warfare directed against trade routes necessitated adaptations in naval techniques. The requirement for extended cruises and long-distance operations led to the replacement of galleys with sailing ships. Low-freeboard, shallow-draft vessels of Scandinavian origin, such as snekkes or drekis, suited to landing of troops and horses, declined in importance in favor of higher-sided ships optimized for deck combat and equipped with raised forecastles and aftercastles. The predominantly mercantile character of city-financed navies resulted in fleets composed largely of temporarily armed merchant vessels. The minimal structural differences between warships and commercial ships permitted their rapid reconversion to trading roles once threats subsided.

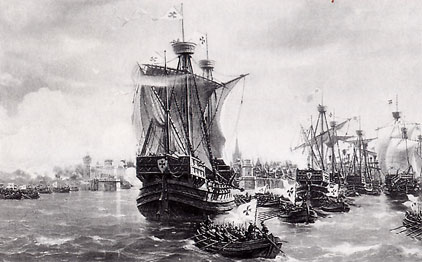
Fleet of medieval hulks financed by Baltic port cities in a 19th-century artist's vision

From the mid-14th century, alongside the cog (kogge), which featured a stern-post rudder aligned with the hull, larger hulk-type vessels (holcke) emerged. These were propelled by a single square sail and could carry crews of up to 200 men. The elevated forecastles and aftercastles of hulks provided decisive advantages in boarding actions, contributing to their predominance in 15th-century Baltic fleets. A significant late medieval innovation was clinker-built planking, which enhanced hull strength and facilitated the construction of larger vessels, including carracks (kraeck) which participated in the Thirteen Years' War as privateer ships on both sides. that served as privateers for both sides in the Thirteen Years' War. Smaller auxiliary types remained in widespread use, including single-masted cargo vessels such as the schnigge and kraier, employed for patrol and reconnaissance, as well as oar-assisted barques (bartze) and smaller ballingers.

==== Armament and equipment ====
In the 15th century, ship armament began to incorporate primitive artillery alongside traditional bows, crossbows, and mechanical throwers. Crews also employed early hand firearms such as hackbuts and hand arquebuses. However, the unreliability of both cannons and charcoal-based gunpowder, combined with reloading times of up to 15 minutes, restricted firearms to an auxiliary role in the opening phases of engagement during the Thirteen Years' War. Long-range combat relied principally on conventional missile weapons. Given the prize-capture orientation of privateering, boarding remained the primary tactic for seizing enemy vessels. Privateer ships therefore carried armed complements roughly six times larger than those of comparable merchantmen. Hanseatic guidelines specifying crew ratios – one sailor per 5–6 lasts of cargo capacity and one soldier per last – were seldom strictly followed. Merchant vessels operating in contested waters similarly embarked armed escorts for protection.

== Battle ==
=== Sources of information about the battle ===
Detailed accounts of Gdańsk's privateer operations during the war, including this engagement, are preserved in the chronicle Geschichte des dreizehnjährigen Krieges by Johann Lindau, secretary to the Gdańsk city council at the time. Surviving letters of marque issued by Gdańsk also provide specifics, such as those granted to Captain Szymon Lubbelow, including the name of his vessel.

=== Course of the battle ===
The council of the city of Gdańsk maintained its own privateer ships on the Baltic Sea, which combated Teutonic navigation. In armed operations on the Baltic, the area between Bornholm and Gotland was of particular importance, islands strategically located at the crossroads of Baltic sea routes. Control over this area allowed control of all Baltic navigation.

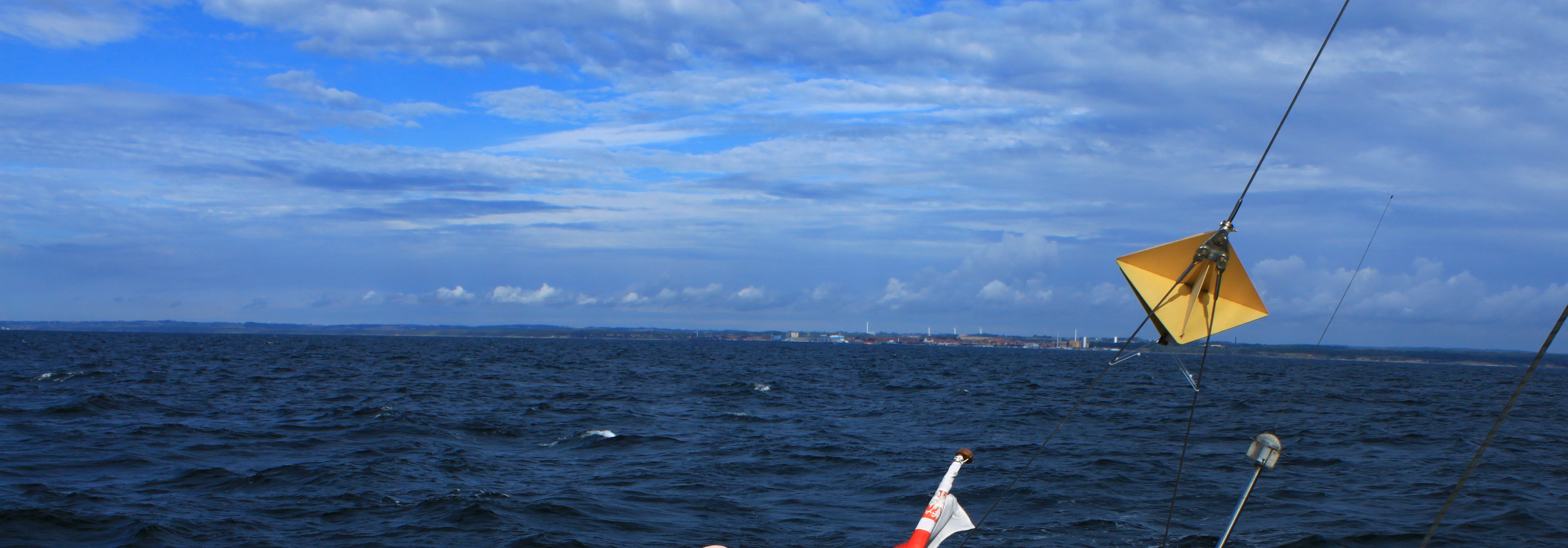
Coast of Bornholm seen from the sea from the southern side of the island

On 8 July 1460, the Gdańsk privateer barque Lyckuff (also known as Birgitte), commanded by Szymon Lubbelow, intercepted a Teutonic force comprising three privateer vessels – a schnigge (or schnigges), a kraier, and a ballinger – crewed by mercenaries and armed citizens from Königsberg. Exploiting the dispersed formation of the Teutonic ships, the Gdańsk vessel sequentially boarded and captured all three. In the action, 20 Teutonic personnel were killed, while 100 soldiers and one knight of the Order were taken prisoner. The captured vessels and prisoners arrived in Gdańsk harbor on 16 July 1460.

== Consequences of the battle ==
News of Captain Lubbelow's decisive victory near Bornholm led to a collapse in the morale of Teutonic privateers. In another encounter, a Teutonic ship in the port of Sandvik on Öland was abandoned by its crew, who fled ashore upon sighting approaching Confederation privateers.

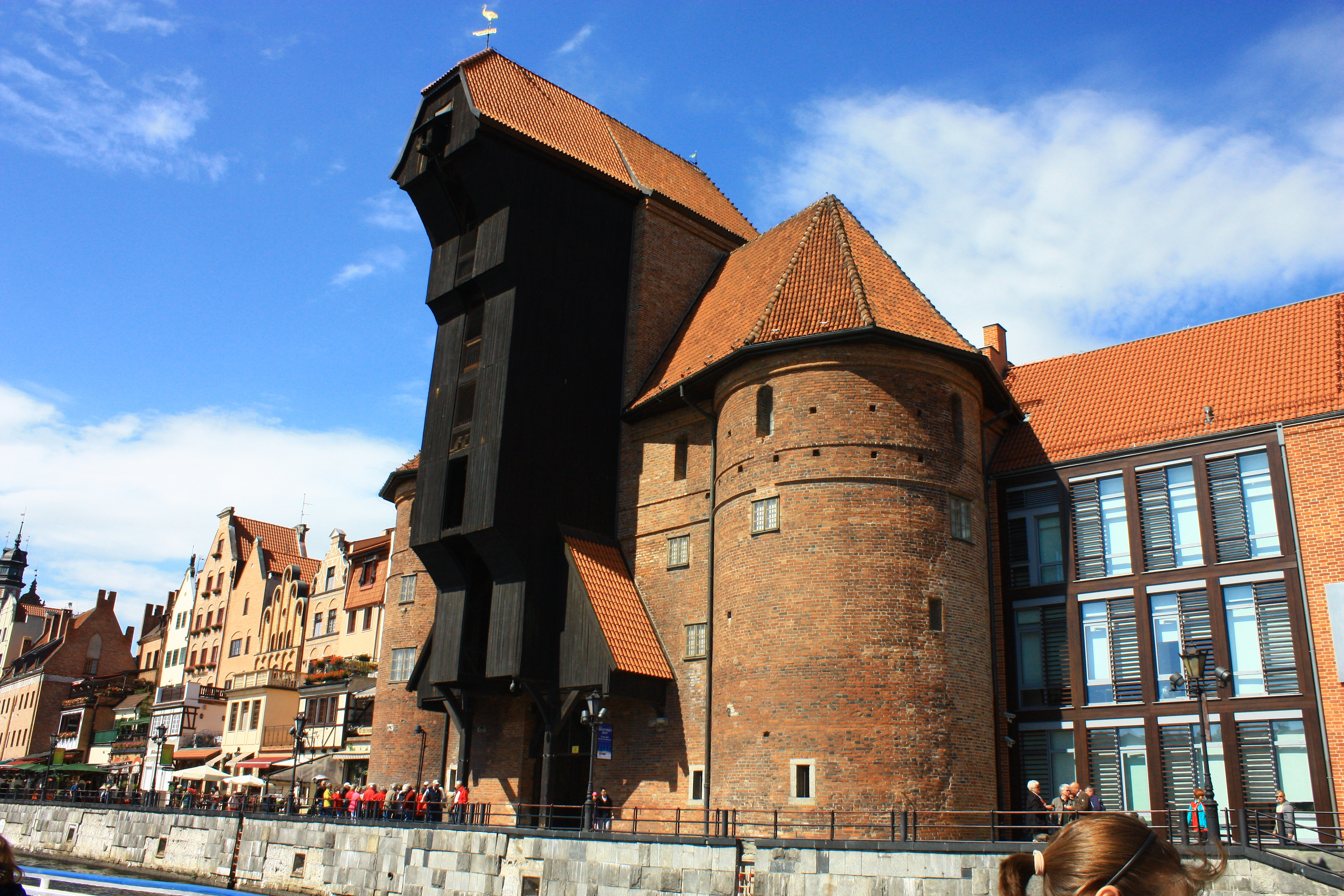
Gdańsk Crane, medieval lifting mechanism in the port and water gate on the Motława river

In the second half of July 1460, three additional Teutonic privateer ships were captured by Hanseatic "peace ships" patrolling the Baltic to combat piracy. These successive defeats ended the Teutonic Order's fleet activity on the open Baltic during the Thirteen Years' War; in the war's final phase, Teutonic privateers limited themselves to raids in the waters of Gdańsk Bay and the Hel Peninsula.

The continuation of intensive privateer operations – resumed in June 1461 with forces involving around 800 men – ultimately secured victory for the Prussian Confederation in the naval theater. Severe restrictions on supplies of war materials and food to Königsberg undermined the Order's base for its successful land campaigns in Lower Prussia between 1460 and 1461. The Teutonic Knights were compelled to route essential supplies via the longer path through Livonian ports served by Dutch and Lübeck vessels. Privateer actions ultimately ensured free navigation to Gdańsk.

The defeat of the Teutonic privateers allowed the Prussian Confederation's fleet to redirect efforts toward coastal and inland operations in the Vistula delta, contributing significantly to the decisive outcome of the 1463 campaign, particularly the Battle of Vistula Lagoon.

== See also ==
- First naval battle near Bornholm (1457)

== Bibliography ==
- Biskup, Marian (2014). Trzynastoletnia wojna z Zakonem Krzyżackim 1454–1466 [The Thirteen Years' War with the Teutonic Order 1454–1466] (in Polish). Oświęcim: Napoleon V. ISBN 978-83-7889-288-5.
- Dyskant, Józef Wiesław (2009). Zatoka Świeża 1463 [Vistula Lagoon 1463] (in Polish). Warsaw: Bellona. ISBN 978-83-1111-571-2.
- Kosiarz, Edmund (1978). Bitwy na Bałtyku [Battles on the Baltic] (in Polish). Warsaw: Wydawnictwo Ministerstwa Obrony Narodowej.
