= Battle for Kneiphof =

Part of the Thirteen Years' War

- Part of Thirteen Years' War (1454–1466)
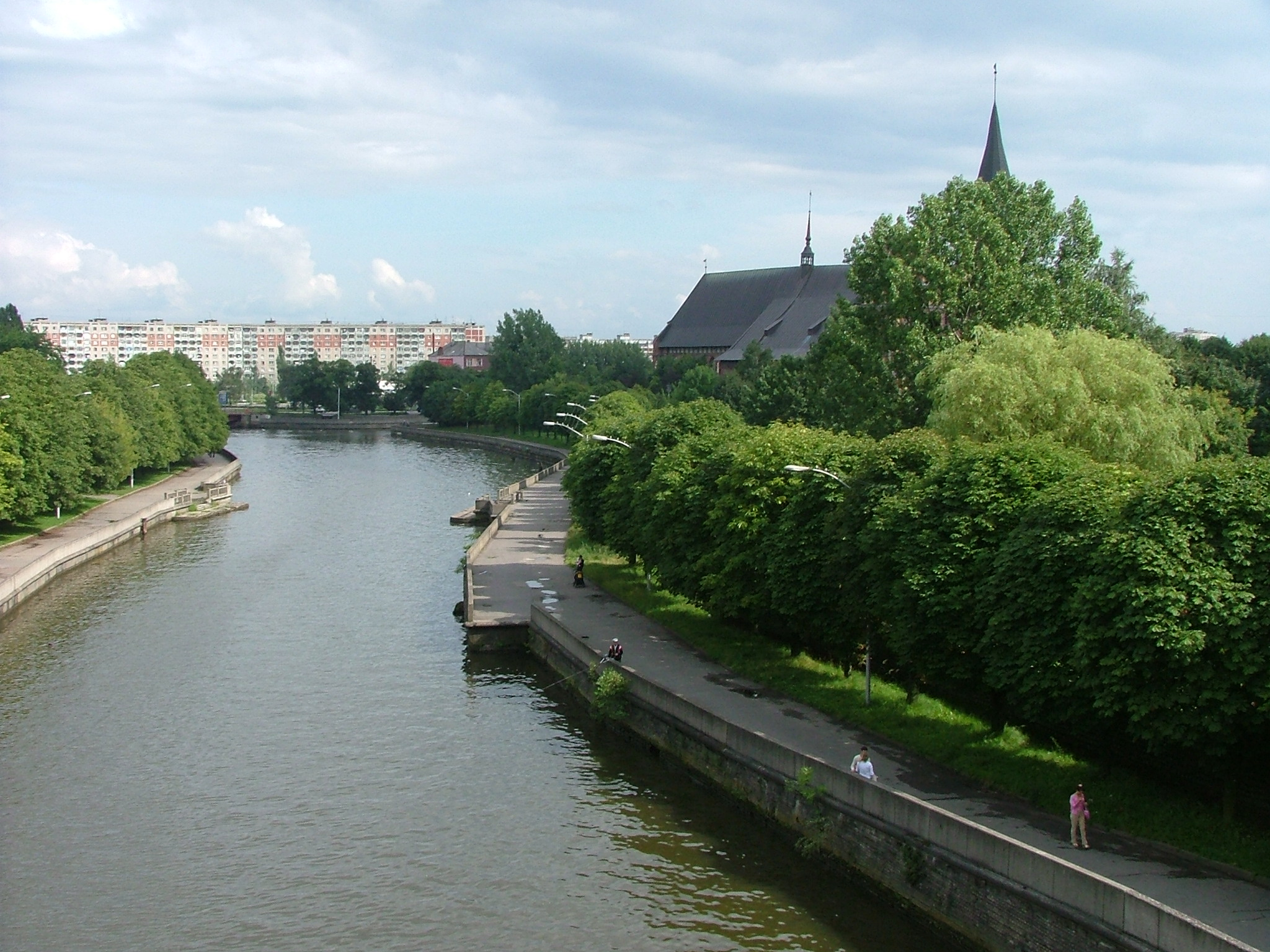
- Kneiphof on the right bank of the Pregolya river – modern-day view
Date	April 13, 1455 – July 14, 1455
Location	Königsberg
Result	Teutonic Order victory
Territorial changes	Lower Prussia

Belligerents
Prussian Confederation	Teutonic Order

Commanders and leaders
Jan Bażyński; Jürgen Langerbein	Ludwig von Erlichshausen; Heinrich Reuß von Plauen; Balthasar of Żagań

Strength
approximately: about 750 soldiers and about 500 sailors reinforced by a group of Lower Prussian knights about 500 mercenaries from the Confederation	about 2,000 Teutonic mercenaries about 600 mercenaries from Livonia 932 cavalrymen and 571 halberdiers from the Duchy of Żagań

Casualties and losses
about 300 men killed	unknown

The Battle for Kneiphof (German: Belagerung des Kneiphofs) was the culmination of the struggle for control over the port district of Königsberg, Kneiphof, lasting from April 13 to July 14, 1455, during the Thirteen Years' War (1454–1466), ending with a decisive victory for the Teutonic Order.

Königsberg actively participated in the anti-Teutonic uprising led by the Prussian Confederation in February 1454, capturing the Teutonic castle and being one of the four cities where the confederates paid homage to Casimir IV Jagiellon, voluntarily joining the Kingdom of Poland. The prolonged Thirteen Years' War and the increasing taxes associated with it resulted in a change in the political orientation of the common people and the pro-Teutonic uprising on 24 March 1455. As a result, the Old Town and Löbenicht districts returned to the control of the Teutonic Order, leaving only the port district of Kneiphof loyal to Casimir IV. Grand Master of the Order, Ludwig von Erlichshausen, directed forces led by the Grand Master Heinrich Reuß von Plauen against it, which, insufficient to carry out a direct assault, began the siege of the fortified district located on a river island on 13 April 1455.

For 14 weeks, the garrison of Kneiphof, led by Mayor Jürgen Langerbein, defended the besieged district. Faced with insufficient assistance from the Prussian Confederation, led by Jan Bażyński, and the defeat of relief efforts by the Teutonic Knights, as well as the reinforcement of the besiegers by troops from Livonia and the Duchy of Żagań, they were forced to surrender on honorable terms on 14 July 1455 after the assault on 7 July 1455.

Due to the strategic position of Königsberg at the mouth of the Pregolya river into the Vistula Lagoon, the Teutonic Order's recapture of control over the city resulted in it once again falling under the authority of the Grand Master of Samland, Lower Prussia, and Masuria, as well as the majority of urban centers in Warmia and Upper Prussia. As a result of the victorious battle, the Order also regained access to the Baltic Sea, the ability to engage in trade with Western Europe, and a foothold for further military operations.

== Origins ==
=== Situation of Lower Prussia during the Thirteen Years' War ===
==== Anti-Teutonic uprising in Lower Prussia in 1454 ====
The success of the anti-Teutonic uprising led by the Prussian Confederation in the Chełmno Land in February 1454 created an atmosphere of decisive rebellion against the authority of Grand Master Ludwig von Erlichshausen throughout the Teutonic state. Following the cities of Pomesania and Pomerania, the majority of the cities in Lower Prussia also declared disobedience to the Grand Master, and the insurgents began capturing Teutonic castles. The Teutonic garrison in the fortress of Kaliningrad repelled several assaults, but after the destruction of four towers and a significant section of the walls, they surrendered the castle to the insurgents led by the mayor of the Old Town (Altstadt) of Kaliningrad, Andreas Brunau.

The fall of Kaliningrad led to the spontaneous defection of Lower Prussia and Samland to the side of the Prussian Confederation: faced with the scale of the rebellion and the helplessness of the besieged Grand Master in Malbork, the Lower Prussian Teutonic Knights, without attempting defense, fled to Malbork or to Germany.

After the Prussian Confederation presented an act of surrender to the crown of the Kingdom of Poland, Kaliningrad pledged allegiance to King Casimir IV Jagiellon on 19 June 1454, delivered by Chancellor Jan Taszka Koniecpolski.

==== Lower Prussia on the sidelines of the main activities of the Thirteen Years' War ====
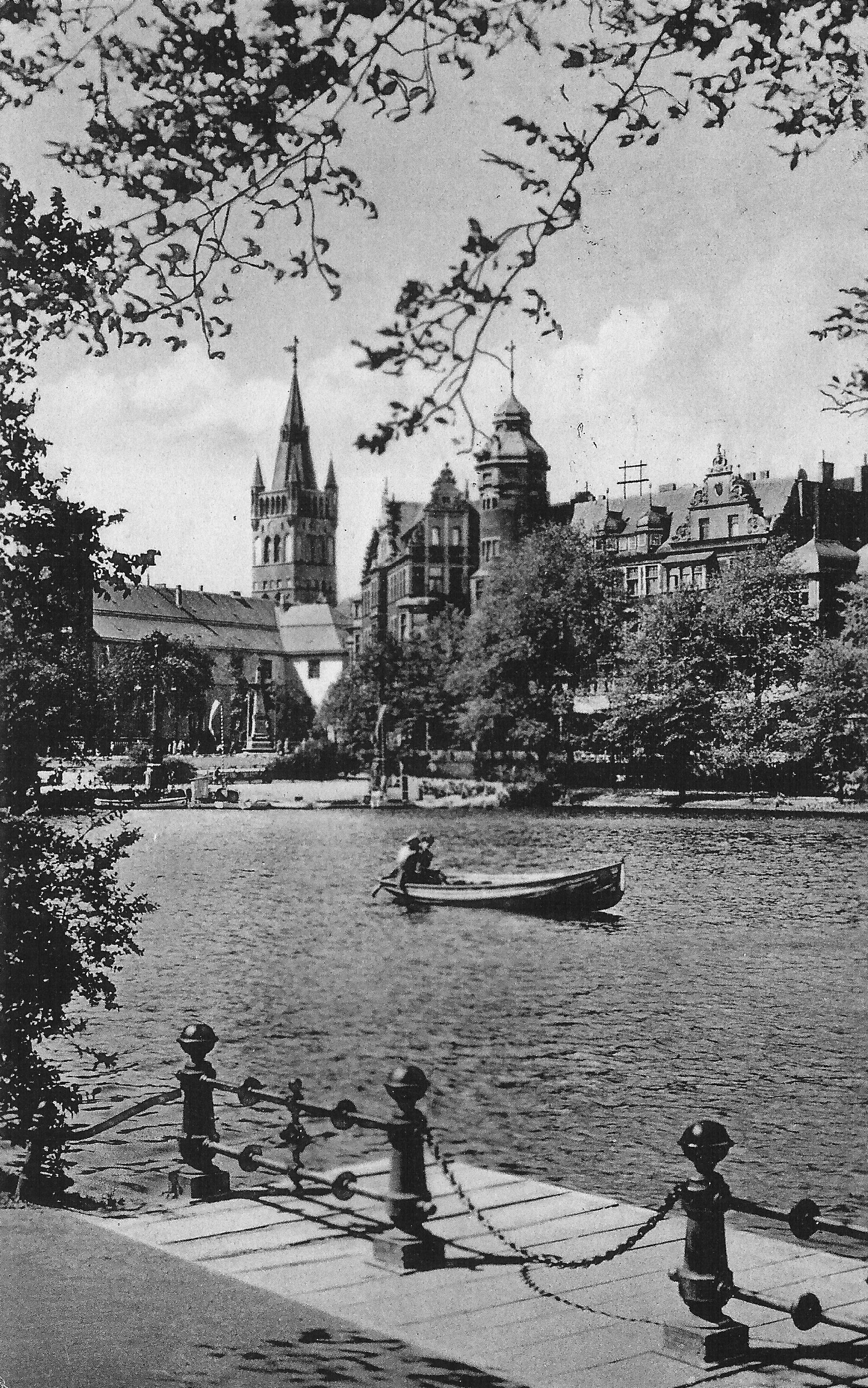
Königsberg Castle on the right bank of the Pregolya branch. The fortress was captured and partially destroyed in the early weeks of the anti-Teutonic uprising in 1454, and Kaliningrad was one of the four cities where the Prussian Confederation pledged feudal allegiance to Casimir IV Jagiellon.

The situation of the Teutonic Order was changed by the defeat of King Casimir IV of Poland in the Battle of Chojnice on 18 September 1454. As a result of the battle, the Teutonic army, composed of mercenaries and coming from the west to relieve Malbork, gained open access to the Teutonic state, and the siege of Malbork was lifted. At the same time, the prestigious defeat of Casimir IV was a shock to a significant portion of the towns and gentry of Prussia and Pomerania, who were unconvinced about the new authority. The attitude of the inhabitants of Prussia was also influenced by the undermining of the act of incorporation among the countries of Europe as a result of the Teutonic Order's victory at Chojnice. Exploiting their wavering, the Teutonic Knights recaptured key positions along the Vistula waterway in 1454 – Sztum, Gniew, and Tczew – threatening to blockade Prussian trade and cut off Gdańsk from Polish support, although Gdańsk itself managed to repel the Teutonic attack on the city.

In October 1454, Grand Master von Erlichshausen reached an agreement with the mercenaries to defer the payment of their wages, allowing the Teutonic Order to continue its military operations. The recapture of control over the northern part of the Chełmno Land, Pomesania, and parts of Upper Prussia, as well as the occupation of the local fortresses, resulted in the Teutonic Knights creating a barrier securing Malbork and the Vistula Fens from the south. Based on this barrier, the Order repelled a Polish offensive on Malbork in January 1455, launched by the forces of the Lesser Poland pospolite ruszenie.

The retreat of the Polish forces enabled the Grand Master to resume a series of offensive actions: in February 1455, the Teutonic Knights occupied Działdowo, cutting off Prussia from Mazovia, and conducted a raid in the Chełmno Land. Subsequent towns and fortresses, fearing Teutonic reprisals for the previous anti-Teutonic uprising or due to the increase in pro-Teutonic sympathies among the inhabitants, once again switched sides to the Order, while only those fortresses in Pomerania that received sufficient military support remained faithful to the king and the Prussian Confederation. In order to provide this support, the mercenaries still in the king's service were divided into small units and directed to individual fortresses.

As a result of these actions, the Teutonic attempts to recapture Toruń and Chełmno ended in failure, but repelling the Grand Master's expedition and suppressing pro-Teutonic conspiracies required the deployment of all available Polish forces, which were lacking in other regions. With the increasing Teutonic threat, it also became increasingly difficult to maintain contact between Toruń and Poland with Gdańsk and Lower Prussia, as Teutonic mercenaries from Gdańsk and Tczew began attacking the confederate navigation on the Vistula and constructing fortifications to block the waterway in February 1455. Consequently, the continuation of vigorous defensive actions by the Polish side to maintain possession and unlock the waterway along the Vistula required the acquisition of new financial resources.

==== Anti-Prussian revolt in Kaliningrad in 1455 ====
Faced with effective attacks by Teutonic garrisons from the fortresses in Gniew and Tczew on unarmed merchant ships sailing on the Vistula to Gdańsk in early 1455, the Prussian Confederation decided to organize a convoy system on the most threatened section from Grudziądz to Gdańsk and hire armed escorts to maintain trade on the Vistula waterway. This decision received support from the merchants who were its direct beneficiaries, but craftsmen from the Pomeranian and Lower Prussian cities opposed the necessity of bearing new costs.

The imposition of new taxes occurred at the assembly of estates in Elbląg in February 1455. Opposition from the commoners against the decisions led to an open revolt on 24 March 1455, in two out of three districts of Kaliningrad: the commoners overthrew the council of the Old Town district and seized the arsenal and city gates. After gaining support from the small Löbenicht district, the bridges connecting both districts with the port district of Kneiphof were destroyed, leading to armed clashes between factions. Mayor Brunau fled to Elbląg.

The new authorities of the Old Town and Löbenicht expressed to Grand Master von Erlichshausen their readiness to enter into negotiations regarding the return to the rule of the Order. At the same time, the residents of Kneiphof, led by Mayor Jürgen Langerbein, called on the Governor of Prussia, Jan Bażyński, to provide assistance to the Lower Prussian cities still loyal to the Prussian Confederation and warned of the possibility of a Teutonic attack on the province.

=== Tribute to the Old Town and Löbenicht ===
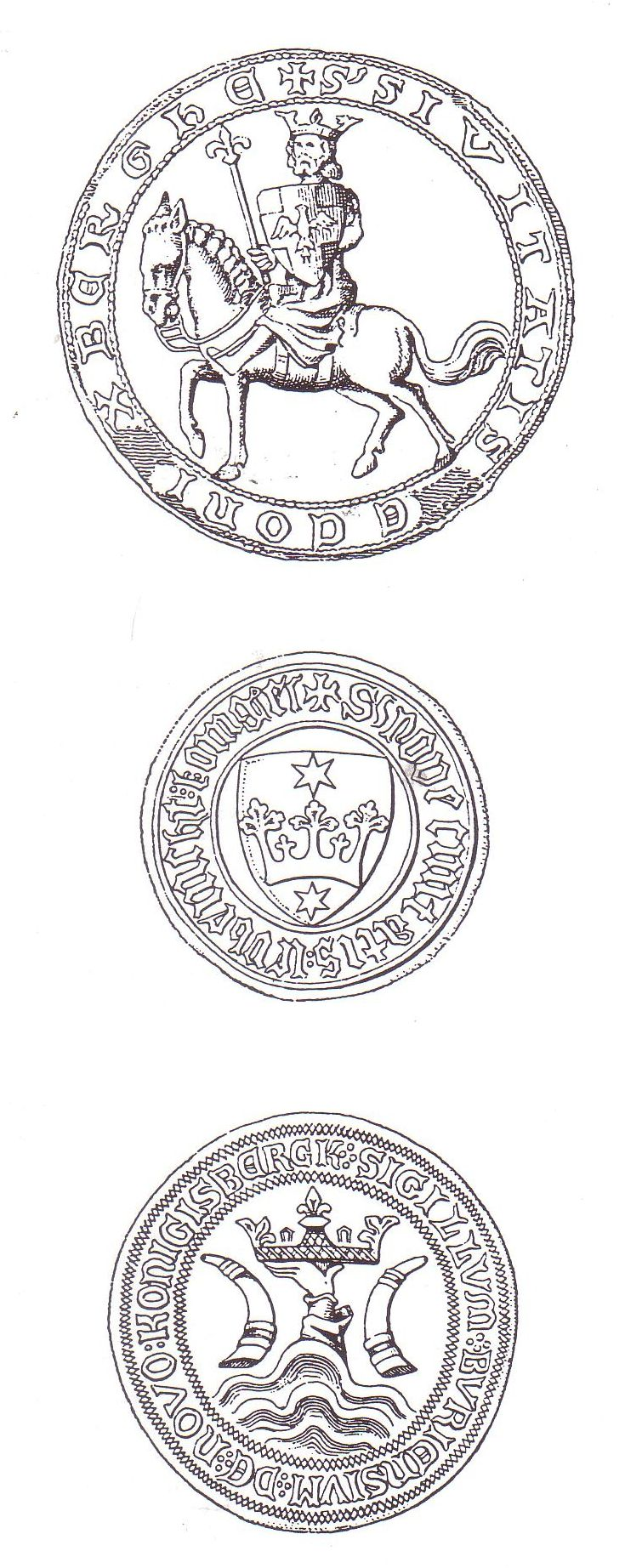
Seals of the Old Town, Löbenicht, and Kneiphof. The districts of Kaliningrad were separate cities, surrounded by fortifications, and governed by local authorities.

At the turn of March and April 1455, the authorities of the Old Town and Kneiphof were inclined to resist the social radicalization of the uprising of the common people and to end the clashes between factions, with their common goal being to achieve favorable privileges for Kaliningrad. Temporary communication between the districts was restored, but a new uprising of the craftsmen of the Old Town prevented any agreement.

The news of the anti-Prussian uprising in Kaliningrad prompted Grand Master von Erlichshausen to act quickly: on 7 April 1455, Teutonic forces, numbering 2000 men and led by Commander von Plauen, set out from Malbork towards Upper Prussia, plundering the New Town of Braniewo and forcing it to swear allegiance to Ushakovo.

Upon receiving news of the Teutonic raid, the Old Town broke off its agreements with the Confederation, and the Prussian estates adopted a wait-and-see attitude. The Teutonic authorities guaranteed the residents of Kaliningrad that their city and properties would not be subject to pledges for the debts of the Teutonic mercenaries, and that additional taxes imposed by the Prussian Confederation would be lifted. On these terms, the Old Town and Löbenicht swore allegiance to the Teutonic Order on 16 April 1455. The authority of the Order was also recognized by Bishop Nicholas of Samland, and Commander von Plauen occupied the fortresses of Primorsk and Löchstadt on the northern shore of the Vistula Lagoon, which lay within Samland.

== Plans of both sides ==
=== Situation of the Teutonic Order ===
The anti-Prussian uprising in Kaliningrad coincided with the Teutonic decision to accelerate military actions, related to the approaching end of the mercenaries' payment period. The weakness of the Teutonic successes, which followed the Battle of Chojnice, was the failure to regain control over any of the major cities of the Prussian state, and thus the failure to regain independent financial capacity for the war. At the same time, the conflict between the Teutonic authorities and the rittmasters – commanders of the mercenary units – was escalating. The mercenaries gathered around Malbork caused significant supply problems for the Teutonic capital, but their commanders were unwilling to move away from the fortress, where they had the right of pledge. As a result, von Plauen's forces near Kaliningrad were sufficient to support pro-Teutonic forces in the Old Town and Löbenicht, but did not allow for the quick capture of Kneiphof.

When Grand Master von Erlichshausen once again failed to meet the deadline for paying the mercenaries on 23 April 1455, on May 2, a mutiny of mercenaries led by the Czech Ulryk Czerwonka in the Teutonic fortresses resulted in the takeover of Malbork, Tczew, and Iława. Grand Master von Erlichshausen, deprived of control over the capital and income from the castle lands, could not support the Teutonic forces besieging Kneiphof. At the same time, the commander of the siege, Grand Master von Plauen, was forced to allocate the collected taxes from Lower Prussia to pay his soldiers, thus exacerbating the critical situation of the Grand Master.

=== Situation of the Prussian Confederation ===
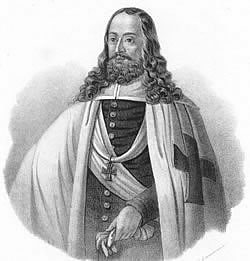
The Grand Hospitaller of the Teutonic Order, Heinrich Reuß von Plauen, commanded the Teutonic forces that captured Kaliningrad. After the Thirteen Years' War, he was elected Grand Master of the Order.

The situation in Kaliningrad required vigorous action from the Polish side, however, in the changing conditions, the mercenary garrisons in the fortresses presented excessive demands and began requisitions among the burghers and peasants, resulting in unrest and desertions. Unpaid mercenaries from Nowe and Starogard refused to fight and concluded a truce with the Teutonic Order on 7 April 1455. The garrisons of the fortresses in the Chełmno Land disregarded the orders of Governor Bażyński.

The leadership of the Prussian Confederation realized the enormous importance of Kneiphof for the further course of the war and appealed to King Casimir IV for relief, but Polish and Prussian commanders were not consistent and lacked sufficient capabilities, and the pospolite ruszenie proved undisciplined and outdated in the mid-15th century. The promised monetary subsidies from the clergy for hiring professional troops could not quickly change the situation. After the death of the main opponent of the war, Zbigniew Oleśnicki, on 1 April 1455, the Kingdom of Poland was determined to continue its actions with the aim of total annexation of Prussia, but the enactment and collection of taxes required time. Agreements were only reached with the mercenaries regarding the installment payment of their wages.

== Strength of both sides ==
The anti-Teutonic uprising in 1454 deprived the Grand Master of the possibility to mobilize armed castle contingents and the feudal pospolite ruszenie, forcing reliance on foot and cavalry mercenary units from Germany and Bohemia. The Thirteen Years' War began in a period following military changes in the late Middle Ages and the decline of the importance of cavalry knights, with infantry armed with firearms and battle wagons becoming significant competitors. Precursors of this tactic were the Taborites, who migrated from Bohemia after the Hussite Wars. The battle formation of the Taborites enabled cooperation between cavalry and infantry and effective use of field artillery placed on wagons.

The forces of the Prussian Confederation were based on city contingents intended for defense of big cities, numbering around 750 soldiers, as well as on the pospolite ruszenie of freemen and Schultheiß, grouped into district banners.

In the battles for fortresses and walled cities, primitive artillery was used, consisting of front-loaded bombards firing stone balls. Lighter cannons, called fauconneau, firing lead balls, and handheld firearms like hackbutts, mounted on wooden frames and hooked onto walls to mitigate recoil, were also used in defense. Bombards allowed for demolishing walls from a short distance. Difficulties with transportation and the unreliability of both the cannons and the gunpowder made from charcoal, sulfur, and saltpeter led to infantry being mainly armed with crossbows, and mounted shooters with bows.

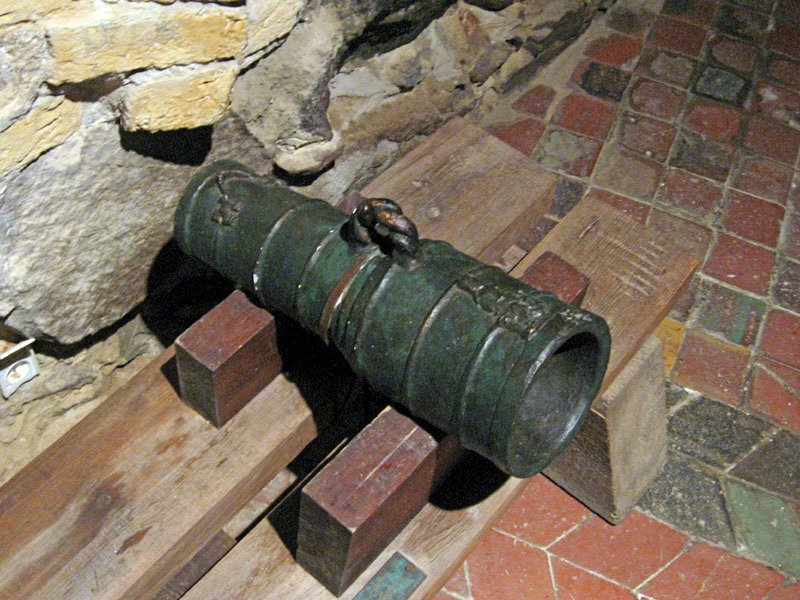
The Teutonic bombard from Kurzętnik, 15th century. The Thirteen Years' War coincided with a period of development in artillery weaponry.

In military operations in the area of Kaliningrad, control over river and coastal communication routes played a significant role. Warships did not have a special design. Fleets were mobilized consisting of temporarily armed and manned merchant ships, both seagoing and riverine. For this purpose, ships were requisitioned from private owners or letters of marque were issued, officially authorizing the captain to attack enemy ships on their own account.

In the first half of the 15th century, the arming of ships with artillery became widespread – iron cannons assembled from welded strips and short cannons firing stone balls. Crews used primitive firearms alongside crossbows and bows, but naval boarding remained the primary method of combat.

The potential of the Gdańsk fleet allowed for the mobilization of over 50 seagoing warships manned by crews of about 1500 men and nearly 100 inland vessels (river and coastal), while the Elbląg fleet could muster about 25 seagoing ships and 700 men, as well as 40 inland vessels. Kaliningrad had a significantly smaller potential, allowing for the mobilization of at most 6 seagoing ships and 30-40 river vessels, manned by about 500 soldiers.

== Course of battle ==
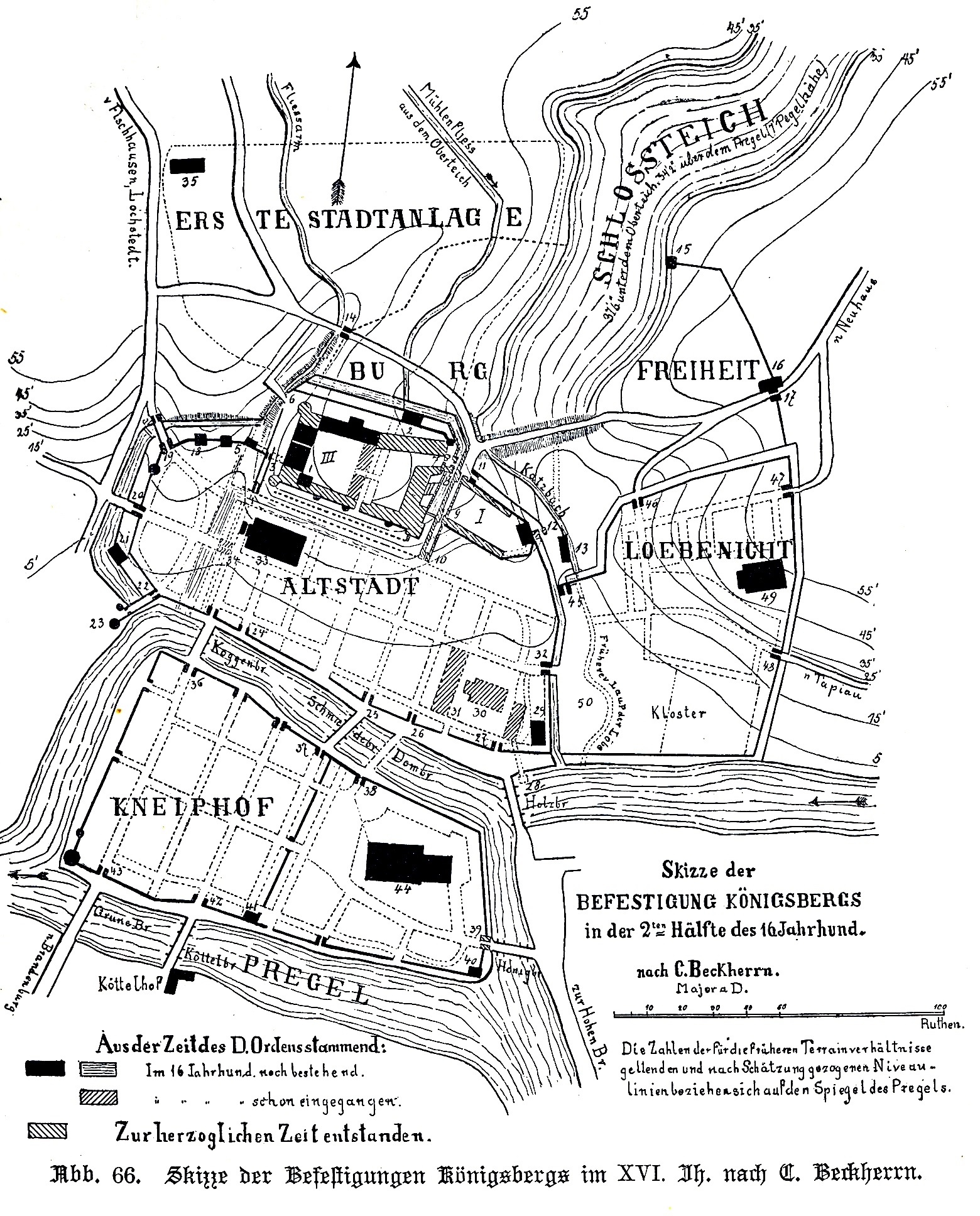
A 16th-century plan of the three districts of Kaliningrad. The city was a major port and a crossroads of trade routes at the crossing of the Pregolya.

=== Siege of Kneiphof ===
Kneiphof was not prepared for defense, but its garrison could rely on a favorable position in a naturally defensible location on an island to the right of the main stream of the Pregolya river. At the same time, the right branch of the Pregolya river separated the district from the Old Town, and the defense was facilitated by the partial destruction of the Kaliningrad castle in 1454, which did not provide cover to the besiegers. The garrison of Kneiphof was reinforced by a group of Lower Prussian knights loyal to the Prussian Confederation, but the district lacked food and military supplies.

On 13 April 1455, even before the siege was closed, an excursion by the residents of Kneiphof to the left bank of the Pregolya river surprised von Plauen's troops, forcing them to retreat, plundering the suburbs of the Old Town.

On 16 April 1455, reinforcements of 100 mercenaries from Gdańsk arrived in Kneiphof.

On 19 April 1455, Kneiphof was completely besieged by the Teutonic Knights, who on 20 April 1455, repelled a counterattack by the forces of Kneiphof, inflicting heavy losses on them. From then on, the only way the besieged district could receive assistance was through the water route of the Pregolya from the west. On 22 April 1455, a convoy from Gdańsk carrying 400 soldiers reached Kneiphof via the Pregolya route after breaking through the chain blocking the river's flow to Kneiphof, established by the Teutonic Knights.

On 26 April 1455, von Plauen's forces won another skirmish against the garrison while attempting to block the district from the west, capturing the banner of the municipal units. On that day, the Teutonic Knights also began a harassing bombardment of the district, conducted from armed boats introduced onto the Pregolya.

In May 1455, the Teutonic Knights constructed fortifications near Pregolya, blocking the sallies of the besieged garrison and any relief from Gdańsk. Kneiphof destroyed the last bridge over the Pregolya connecting it to the Old Town, but the Teutonic Knights built two massive bridges across the river below the district and blocked the riverbed, placing armed boats between the barriers. As a result of these actions, Kneiphof was completely cut off, but von Plauen's forces were not strong enough to launch an assault.

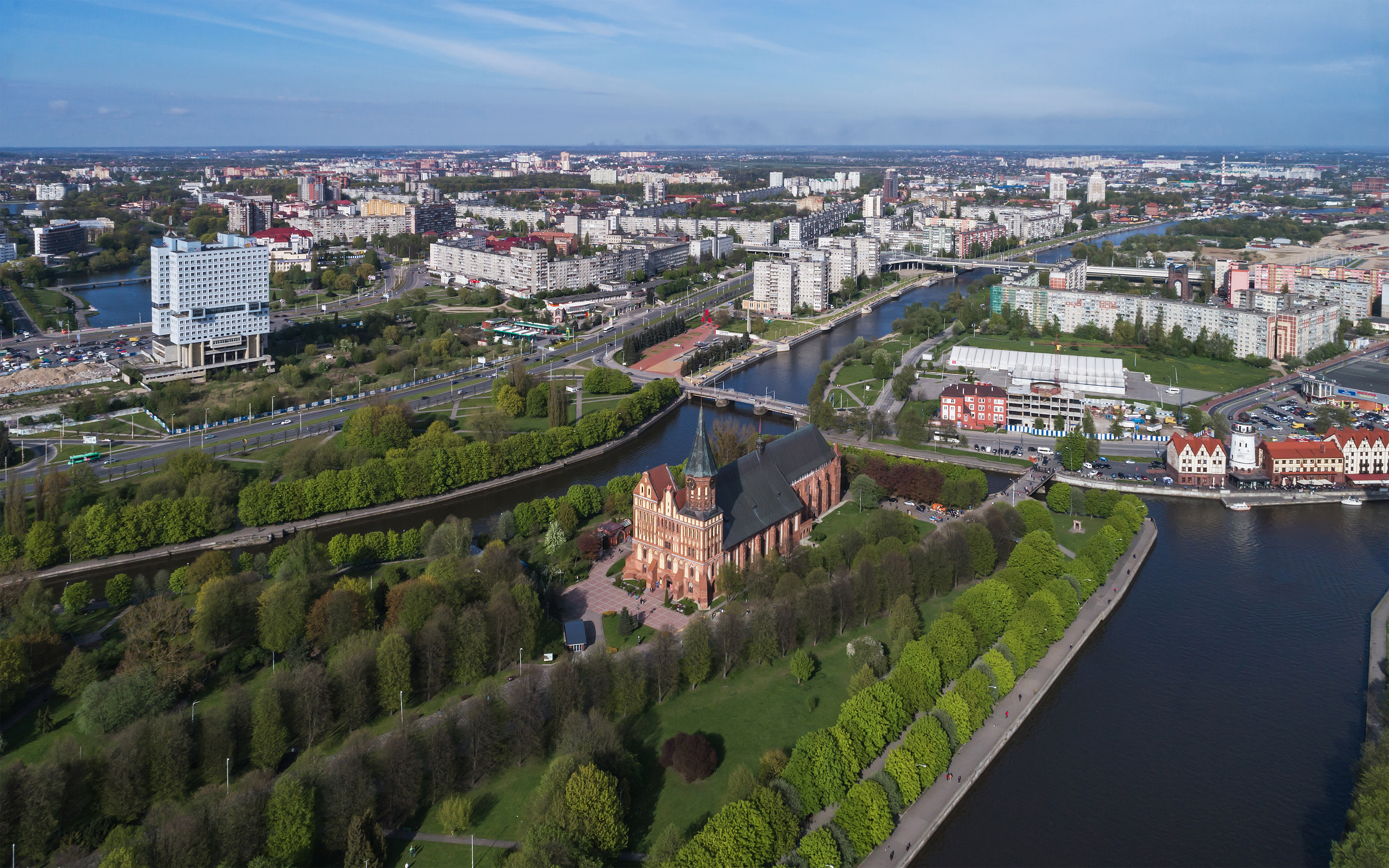
A modern-day view of Kneiphof (on the right). The defensive position of the district on an island, surrounded by the waters of the Pregolya and its right branch, enabled the garrison to offer prolonged resistance.

=== Attempts to relieve Kneiphof ===
Despite calls from the authorities of Kneiphof, Piotr of Szamotuły, preoccupied with protecting Pomerania, could not organize effective relief. Appeals by Gabriel Bażyński to the Lower Prussian knights and mercenaries to gather in Orneta and Elbląg were disregarded – mercenaries serving as garrisons in the Prussian fortresses did not receive their pay on time and primarily engaged in seizing their owed payments from estates around Gdańsk. Limited actions by Prussian garrisons from the Łyna valley did not improve the situation.

Kneiphof remained the only defending Prussian stronghold along the lower Pregolya because, due to the lack of reinforcement from royal mercenaries to the towns and fortresses of Lower Prussia, from April 17 to April 26, 1455, the entire region once again violently fell under the control of the Order. By the end of April 1455, the garrison of the fortress held by the Teutonic Knights in Gvardeysk halted Gdańsk ships heading to Kneiphof from Kaunas. In May 1455, a fleet was sent from Gdańsk to Kneiphof, but the expedition was canceled when one of its leaders, the mercenary Jan Czajka sent from Poland by Casimir Jagiellon, fell ill.

In May 1455, the Prussian Confederation managed to gather a pospolite ruszenie from Lower Prussia, numbering around 2000 men, led by Ramsza Krzykowski, a confederate commander from Bartoszyce. These forces, under his leadership, unsuccessfully attempted to capture the fortress in Prussian Iława. The assault on the castle did not occur, and on 24 May 1455, the army organized a defensive camp. In the early morning, in dense fog, a detachment of 550 Teutonic Knights' cavalrymen sent from Kaliningrad attacked the wagon fort. The camp was captured after fierce defense, with over 800 members of Confederation killed, 300 taken prisoner, and Ramsza Krzykowski fleeing with around 250 cavalrymen. The most serious attempt at land relief for Kneiphof was repelled.

Another attempt, led by Andrzej Tęczyński, a small expedition with royal mercenaries, only reached Warmia.

=== Naval blockade of Kaliningrad ===
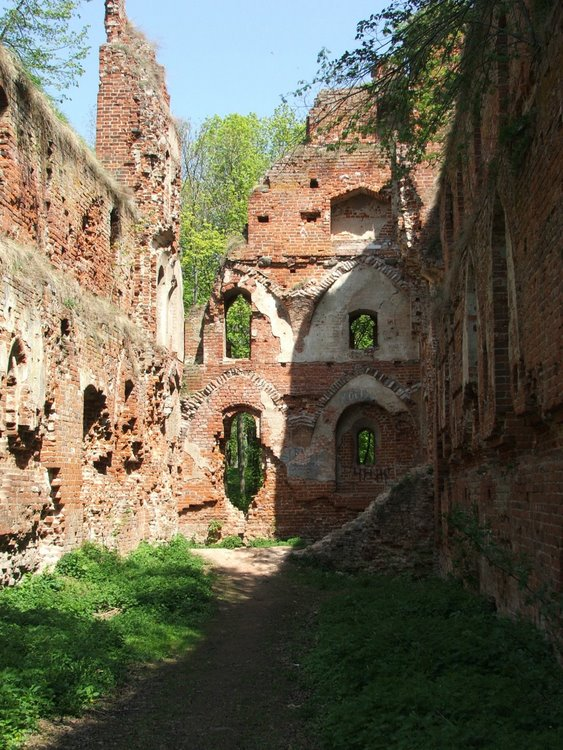
The ruins of a Teutonic castle in Balga. The medieval Balga Strait, facilitating navigation between the Baltic Sea and the Vistula Lagoon, played a crucial role in maritime operations during the Thirteen Years' War.

Parallel to the attempts to provide assistance to the besieged district by sea to the mouth of the Pregolya, Gdańsk mobilized a fleet of armed ships to cut off von Plauen's forces from supplies and conduct diversions behind the Teutonic Knights' lines. The blockade was commanded by Hening German and Berbt Pawes. In April 1455, Gdańsk ships blockaded Tczew, held by the Teutonic Knights, and on 10 April 1455, they burned Lisewo.

In May 1455, Gdańsk intensified efforts to cut off supplies to Kaliningrad from the Vistula Fens, but the fortifications erected by Gdańsk mercenaries along the Vistula's bank were destroyed by the Teutonic Knights, and the Gdańsk blockade failed to stop Teutonic reinforcements from Livonia reaching the besieged Kneiphof.

In June 1455, a fleet of 13 ships commanded by councilor Jan von Schauwen from Gdańsk blockaded the Vistula Lagoon and, by capturing 3 Teutonic ships, disrupted communication between Kaliningrad and Samland. The Gdańsk landing party also plundered the Balga area and occupied the Old Town of Braniewo, Dobre Miasto, and Orneta.

=== Kneiphof's fall ===
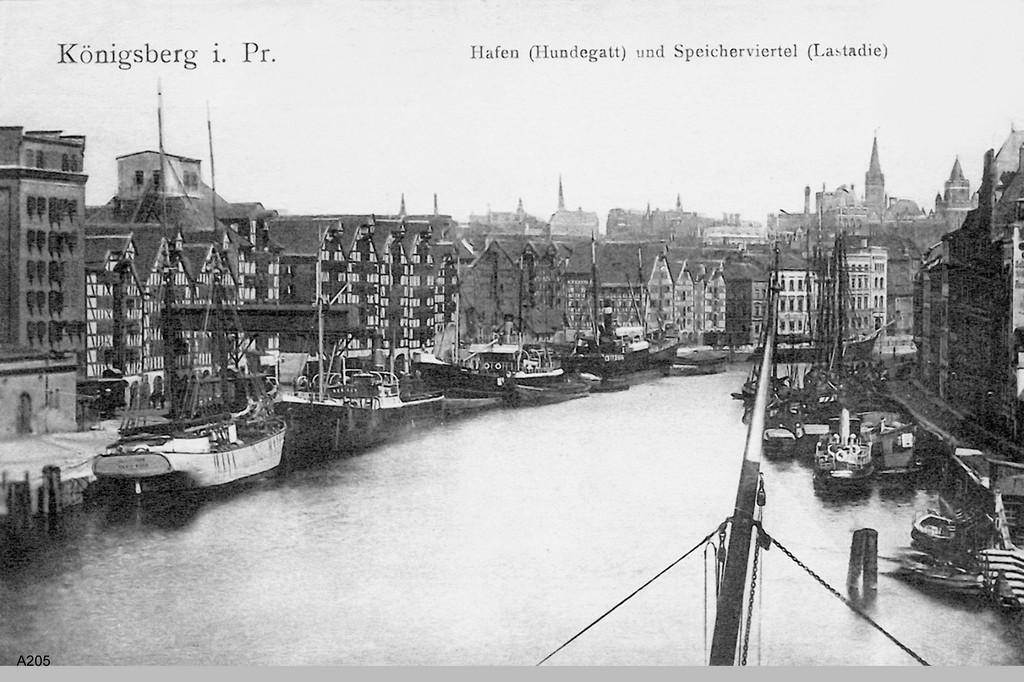
The lower stretch of the Pregolya below Kneiphof. The waterway through the Vistula Lagoon and the lower Pregolya was the only route through which the besieged district could expect to receive supplies.

The effective Teutonic blockade caused a famine in the besieged district. Between May 9 and 13, another Gdańsk convoy attempted to break through the Teutonic barrier on the Pregolya, but the attempts proved unsuccessful, and additionally, the Prussian garrisons were beaten and taken prisoner by the Teutonic Knights after disembarking near Primorsk.

Another attempt to break the blockade, undertaken by a team of 4 heavy and 10 light boats commanded by Jan Fryburg and Roloff Feldstete, manned by Polish mercenaries, was repelled by the Teutonic Knights on 16 May 1455. In mid-May 1455, the forces besieging Kneiphof were significantly reinforced by a unit of 600 mercenaries paid by Livonia, who arrived at the mouth of the Pregolya by sea along the coast.

On 16 June 1455, the unencumbered by pawn agreements Silesian Duke Balthasar of Żagań left Malbork at the head of forces consisting of 932 cavalrymen and 571 trabants along with artillery, composed of Silesian mercenaries not engaged in agreements with the garrisons of the surrounding fortresses. Upon arriving at the besieged Kneiphof, this unit significantly strengthened von Plauen's forces once again.

At the turn of June and July 1455, von Plauen ordered preparations for the final assault on Kneiphof and took command of the unit designated for the assault by the river. Prince Balthasar led preparations for the attack from the side of the Old Town. Under the direction of the Hanseatic Commander Klaus Klockner, the Teutonic Knights equipped their ships and boats with assault bridges and movable ladders enabling attacks on the walls from the river side.

On 6 July 1455, the Teutonic Order's forces launched a general assault on the besieged district, attacking simultaneously from the south on boats through the Pregolya and attempting to breach the city walls from the north. The assault was repelled after several hours by defenders shooting from behind the walls; however, it marked the last victory for the besieged garrison. Faced with another assault by the Teutonic Knights on 7 July 1455, Kneiphof requested, through Duke Balthasar, a ceasefire.

Negotiations regarding the terms of the districts' surrender lasted for 8 days. On 14 July 1455, Kneiphof surrendered on honorable and favorable terms.

Under the treaty, the residents of Kneiphof were granted full amnesty for their participation in the anti-Teutonic rebellion in 1454, as well as for their involvement in the fighting in 1455. Opponents of the Teutonic Order, as well as Prussian forces and Gdańsk merchants, were allowed to leave the city within two months with their belongings. Refugees from the Old Town of Kaliningrad were given the right to reclaim their immovable property. At the same time, the district retained its existing privileges, autonomous city council elections, the right to rebuild the damaged city walls, and exemption from certain taxes. In return, it was compelled to fully renounce the Prussian Confederation and recognize the full authority of the Teutonic Order, as well as to pay homage. Kneiphof solemnly paid homage to the hands of Commander Heinrich Reuß von Plauen and Duke Balthasar of Żagań on 15 July 1455.

== Aftermath ==
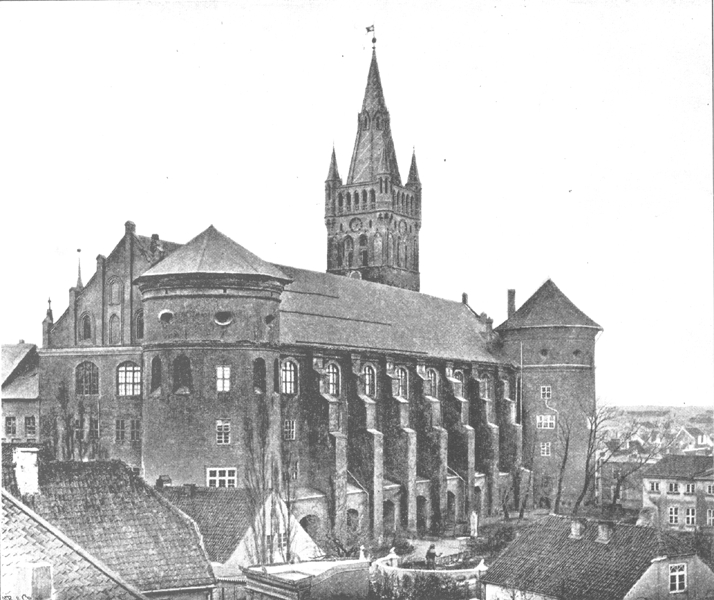
A Teutonic castle in Kaliningrad. The fall of Kneiphof allowed the Teutonic Order to establish a bastion of resistance in Kaliningrad, which became the capital of the Teutonic Order's state from 1457 onwards.

During the prolonged defense, Kneiphof lost 300 men. On 18 July 1455, the authorities of the district sent a letter of justification to Gdańsk and the authorities of the Prussian Confederation, explaining the capitulation as being due to the impossibility of continuing the defense in the face of losses and exhaustion of supplies. The inhabitants of Kneiphof explained their switch to the side of the Teutonic Order by the failure of effective assistance from King Casimir IV and the Prussian Confederation.

After repelling the attack of the Gdańsk fleet on Samland in October 1456, the victorious Teutonic Order applied reprisals against the city council of Kneiphof, suspecting it of disloyalty and maintaining secret contacts with the Prussian Confederation, as well as involvement in preparing the Gdańsk amphibious operation.

=== The effects of the battle on the course of the Thirteen Years' War ===
The Battle for Kneiphof lasted for 14 weeks and ended with the greatest success of the Teutonic Order during the Thirteen Years' War – the permanent seizure of a large urban center controlling the trade routes of Lower Prussia and Samland. The Order also regained access to the Baltic Sea. Another significant success for the Teutonic Knights was the establishment of a foothold for further military operations in the undamaged Samland and gaining control over a city not covered by pawn agreements with mercenaries. The moral and prestigious significance of capturing Kneiphof is also evidenced by the agreement of Warmia, influenced by the outcome of the siege, to the Teutonic control over Warmia along with Olsztyn. The Grand Master also regained control over the cities of eastern Masuria.

The fall of Kneiphof ultimately ended the brief period of Polish rule in Kaliningrad, thwarting plans for the complete annexation of the Prussian state by the Kingdom of Poland. The Teutonic conquest of Kaliningrad deprived the Lower Prussian estates of urban leadership and shifted sympathy towards the Order. Gdańsk, threatened by the activity of the Teutonic garrison in Chojnice in Pomerania, could not influence the situation in the province, nor could it control the unpaid Prussian garrison from Starogard. Deprived of funds, King Casimir IV had no means of intervention.

=== Interstate context of the battle ===
Despite the mere 110-kilometer distance between Kneiphof and the border of the Grand Duchy of Lithuania, the besieged district's garrison did not receive relief from the other Jagiellonian state. Lithuania failed to capitalize on the favorable situation of weakness on both sides of the conflict to deliver a decisive blow to the Teutonic Order independently. As a consequence of its passive stance, the Grand Duchy squandered the opportunity to strengthen its position in the Baltic region and eliminate the eastern part of the Prussian state. Casimir IV suffered a political defeat in his dispute with the council of the Grand Duchy and failed to persuade Lithuania to intervene against the Teutonic Order and provide assistance to Kneiphof. The balance of power in Lithuania shifted in favor of magnates, led by Jonas Goštautas, who were hostile to tightening bonds with Poland. They pushed through the Grand Duchy's hostile neutrality towards Poland, sabotaging the king's efforts.

By recapturing Kaliningrad, the Teutonic Order also regained access to the sea, allowing them to receive reinforcements and supplies from Livonia, Germany, and Denmark. Even during the siege, the Kingdom of Denmark, Amsterdam, and some Hanseatic cities, including Flensburg, reached an agreement regarding the maintenance of freedom of navigation to cities held by the Teutonic Order. In response, Gdańsk issued warnings to the Hanseatic League on 24 July 1455, and to Amsterdam on 29 July 1455, regarding their trade with Kaliningrad, and mobilized a privateer fleet to counter attempts to break the blockade. Threatened by these actions, the Kingdom of Denmark declared war on Poland and the Prussian Confederation on 5 October 1455, joining the Thirteen Years' War on the side of the Teutonic Order.

== Bibliography ==
- Baczkowski, Krzysztof (1999). Dzieje Polski późnośredniowiecznej. Vol. 3. Kraków: Wielka Historia Polski. ISBN 83-85719-40-7.
- Barkowski, Robert F. (2017). Historia wojen gdańskich – średniowiecze. Bellona Spólka Akcyjna. ISBN 978-83-11-14343-2.
- Biskup, Marian (2014). Trzynastoletnia wojna z Zakonem Krzyżackim. Oświęcim: Napoleon V. ISBN 9788378892885.
- Biskup, Marian (1990). Wojna trzynastoletnia i powrót Polski nad Bałtyk w XV wieku. Kraków: Krajowa Agencja Wydawnicza. ISBN 83-03-03076-0.
- Dyskant, Józef Wiesław (2009). Zatoka Świeża 1463. Warsaw: Bellona. ISBN 9788311115712.
- Jasienica, Paweł (1992). Polska Jagiellonów. Warsaw: Państwowy Instytut Wydawniczy. ISBN 83-06-01796-X.
- Konopczyński, Władysław (2014). Kwestia bałtycka. Kraków-Warsaw: Ośrodek Myśli Politycznej. ISBN 978-83-62628-52-0.
- Nowaczyk, Bernard (2012). Chojnice 1454. Świecino 1461. Bellona. ISBN 978-83-11-12337-3.
- Nowak, Andrzej (2017). Królestwo zwycięskiego orła 1340–1468. Kraków: Biały Kruk. ISBN 978-83-7553-223-4.
- Rogalski, Leon (1846). Dzieje Krzyżaków oraz ich stosunki z Polską, Litwą i Prusami. Vol. II. Warsaw: S. Orgelbrand.
