= Battle of Bornholm (1457) =

- Part of Thirteen Years' War
Date	1457
Location	Bornholm island, south of modern Sweden
Result	Victory for the Gdańsk flotilla

Belligerents
Privateers from the city of Gdańsk	Denmark; Livonian Order

Commanders and leaders
Jakub Heine; Jocki Lenyn; Bartz Lenyn	Unknown

Strength
3 ships	16 ships

Casualties and losses
12 soldiers	300 soldiers 1 ship

The Battle of Bornholm was a naval battle which took place near the Danish island of Bornholm, between privateers from the city of Gdańsk (Danzig) and a transport convoy of Danish and Livonian ships which were attempting to bring supplies and reinforcements to the Teutonic Knights in Prussia, during the Thirteen Years' War (1454–66) between the Kingdom of Poland and the Prussian Confederation on one hand, and the Monastic State of the Teutonic Knights on the other. The battle took place on the night of 14 August 1457.

The Gdańsk flotilla, composed of only 3 ships compared to the Danish and Livonian 16, was victorious; the outcome demonstrated the importance of light, fast ships which could attack quickly and with the element of surprise. The battle helped to establish a naval blockade of the Teutonic state in Prussia, and together with the subsequent and more significant Polish-Prussian naval victory in the Battle of Vistula Lagoon contributed to the overall victory of Poland in the Thirteen Years' War.

== See also ==
- Battle of Bornholm (1460)
