= Battle of Eylau (1455) =

- Part of the Thirteen Years' War
Date	25 May 1455
Location	Eylau, State of the Teutonic Order (now Iława, Poland)
Result	Teutonic victory

Belligerents
Crown of the Kingdom of Poland	State of the Teutonic Order

Commanders and leaders
Ramsz Krzykowski	Ludwig von Helfenstein; John von Blanckenstein.

Strength
2,000 soldiers	550 cavalrymen

Casualties and losses
800–1,000 dead 300 captured	Unknown

The Battle of Eylau (Note: Polish: Bitwa pod Pruską Iławą; Bitwa pod Iławą) was a battle of the Thirteen Years' War, that took place on 25 May 1455, near the town of Eylau (now Iława, Poland). It was fought between forces of the Crown of the Kingdom of Poland, led by Ramsz Krzykowski, against the cavalry of the State of the Teutonic Order, led by Ludwig von Helfenstein, and John von Blanckenstein.

== The battle ==
In 1455, during the Thirteen Years' War, the forces of the State of the Teutonic Order, besieged Polish-controlled Kneiphof. As such, local pro-Polish population organized a force of 2 000 soldiers, led by Ramsz Krzykowski, to be sent to Kneiphof, to help in the battle. On their way there, they besieged the Teutonic castle in the nearby town of the town of Eylau (now Iława, Poland. The besieging forces were commanded by Ramsz Krzykowski. In the morning of 25 May 1455, the rebel forces were attacked by the Teutonic cavalry, that consisted of 550 cavalrymen, that was led by Ludwig von Helfenstein, and John von Blanckenstein. The forces came from near by Königsberg (now Kaliningrad, Russia). Utilizing the element of surprise, they managed to defeat Polish rebels, inflicting major casualties on Polish side. In the battle, on Polish side, died between 800 and 1000 people, and 300 were taken captive. Krzyszkowski, together with around 250 soldiers, retreated to Bartoszyce.
