= Bernard Szumborski =

Bernard Szumborski (German: Bernhard von Zinnenberg) was a Moravian knight and a mercenary. Szumborski was hired by the Teutonic Knights during the Battle of Chojnice (part of Thirteen Years' War), and was sent with 15,000 men to relieve the besieged city of Chojnice. King Casimir IV of Poland sent cavalry attacks to the rear of the Teutonic lines and Szumborski was captured. However, Teutonic knights rallied up and caused panic. Szumborski managed to escape and organized the pursuit of the fleeing Polish army. On October 24, 1457, together with 2000 mercenaries, Szumborski captured Chełmno (Kulm), and killed its mayor, Michal Segemund, claiming that he was a traitor. His forces captured other towns of Pomerelia and Chełmno Land, and on March 21, 1458, Szumborski with his army approached Toruń (Thorn), burning its suburbs, but failing to capture the heavily fortified city. On September 19, 1460, Szumborski captured the town of Golub-Dobrzyń, but Polish garrison of its castle, commanded by Andrzej Puszkarz, managed to hold it. In August 1466, Szymborski, as envoy of the Teutonic Knights, was sent to Bydgoszcz, to negotiate with King Casimir IV and his envoys, Jan Długosz and Jan Sapienski. The negotiations ended on October 19, 1466, when the Second Peace of Thorn was signed. Szymborski, regarded as a very cruel man, died on January 7, 1470. As Jan Długosz recorded, he was poisoned by a female resident of Chełmno.
