= Lower Prussia =

Lower Prussia Prusy Dolne
- Historical region
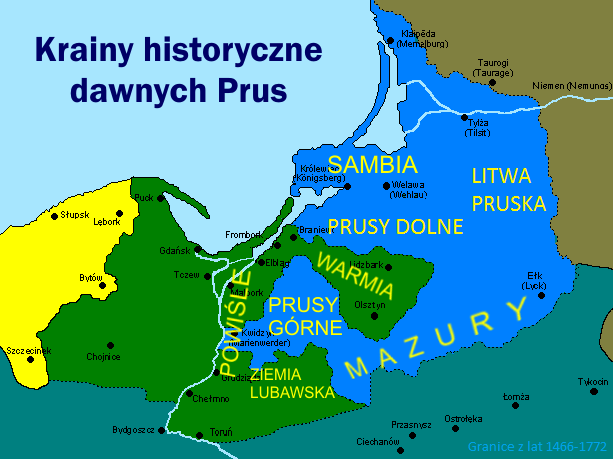
- Prusy Dolne on the map of the region of Prussia
- Country: Poland; Russia

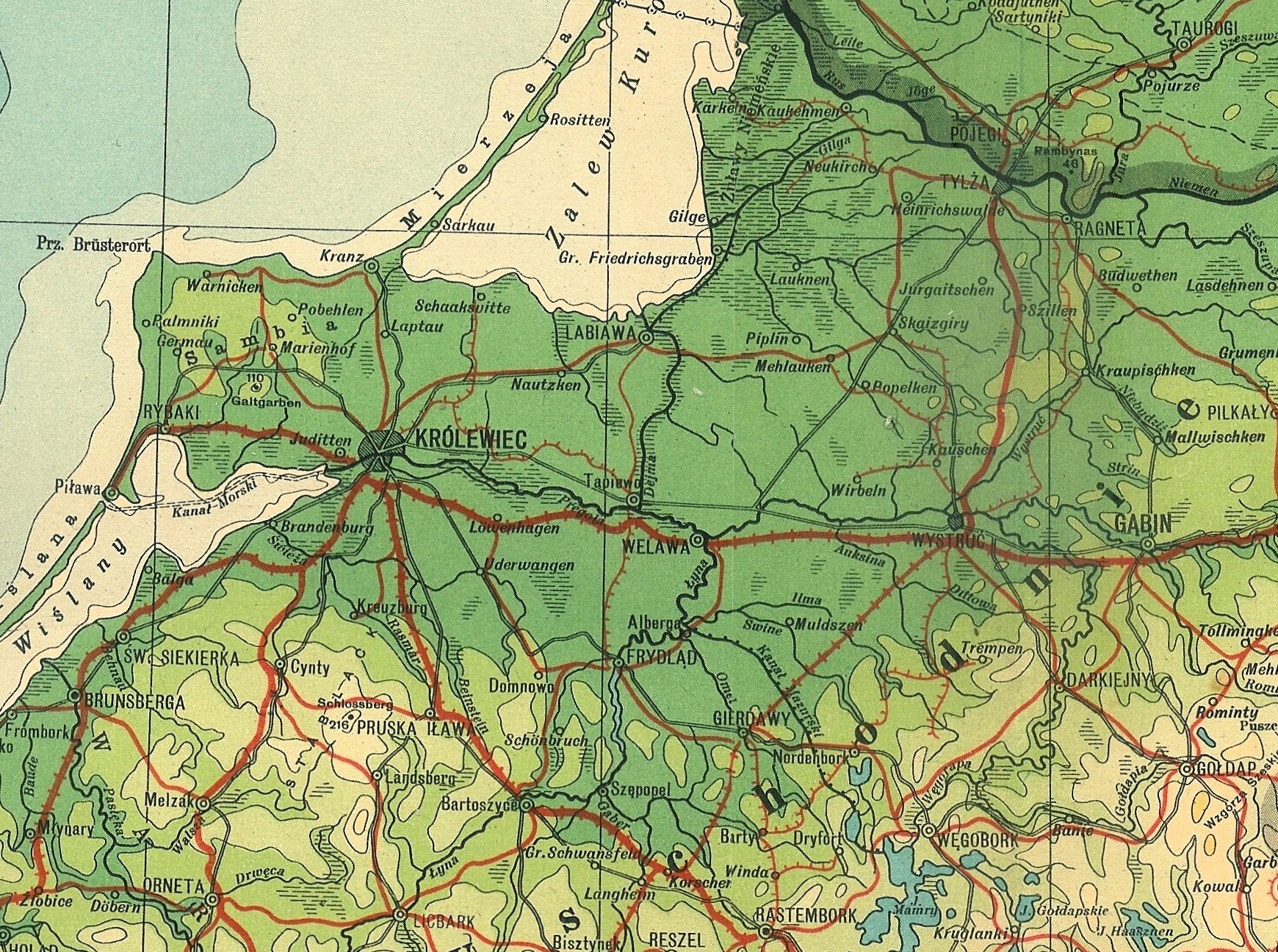
1920 map of the Lower Prussia

Lower Prussia (Polish: Prusy Dolne; German: Niederland, lit. Low land) is a part of the historical region of Prussia, divided between Kaliningrad Oblast, Russia, and Warmian-Masurian Voivodeship, Poland. It is located in the basin of rivers Pregolya and Łyna.

== History ==
Historically, the whole region of Prussia had been under the State of the Teutonic Order. The area of Lower Prussia was viewed as an important location for the construction of defensive castles prior to the Polish–Lithuanian–Teutonic War, with the construction of them being personally overseen by the Grand Master Ulrich von Jungingen. Following the establishment of the Duchy of Prussia, Lower Prussia was established by Albert of Prussia as part of an administrative division of the Duchy, with Upper Prussia and Sambia making up the remainder of the three divisions. Lower Prussia was then subdivided into elderships. During the mid-1500s, Lower Prussia became a place where a large number of anabaptists settled, with the majority settling near Danzig.

Following the end of the Second World War, Lower Prussia was taken out of German sovereignty and split between the Republic of Poland and the Soviet Union. The Soviets then assigned administration of their section to the Russian Soviet Federative Socialist Republic. Following the dissolution of the Soviet Union, administration remained with the Russian Federation as an exclave in the following years.
