= Pan Podstoli =

1778 novel by Ignacy Krasicki

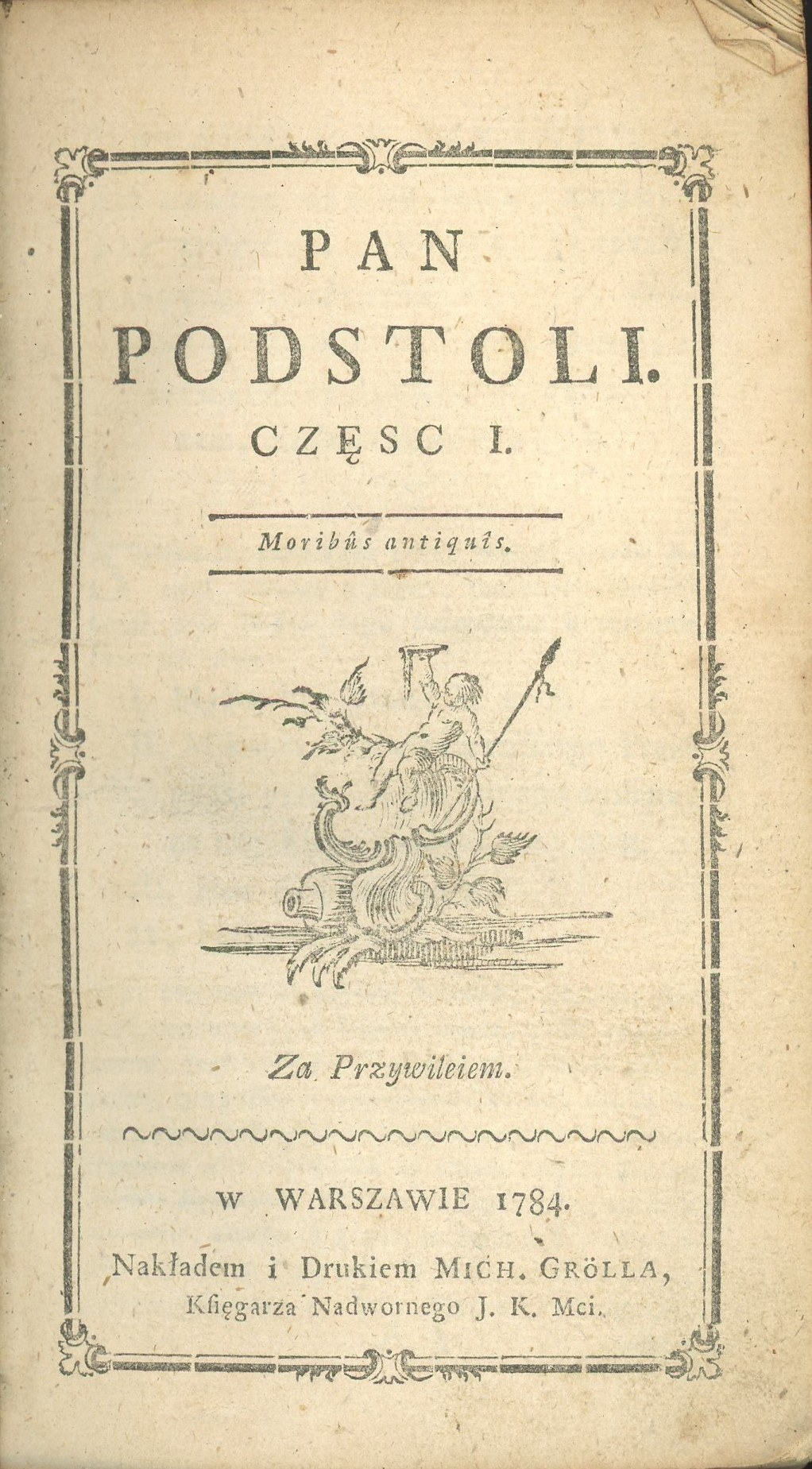
- Title page for Pan Podstoli (1784)
- Author: Ignacy Krasicki
- Language: Polish
- Genre: Novel
- Publication date: 1778
- Publication place: Poland

Pan Podstoli (Lord Steward, or Royal Pantler) is a novel by Polish author, Ignacy Krasicki, published in several parts (1778, 1784 and 1803). It is one of the first Polish novels, and one of the most important works by Krasicki. It served as an inspiration for future Polish novelists and other writers, including Adam Mickiewicz.

== History ==
Krasicki wrote the first part in 1776, and it was published in 1778, without any indication of a sequel. Krasicki would however publish a second part in 1784, and write a third one, published posthumously in 1803. Krzyżanowski writes that part four was planned, but never written.

The novel was likely inspired by Krasicki's experiences with the Monitor newspaper, Renaissance works of Łukasz Górnicki and the treatise on peasants by Hans Caspar Hirzel.

== Plot ==
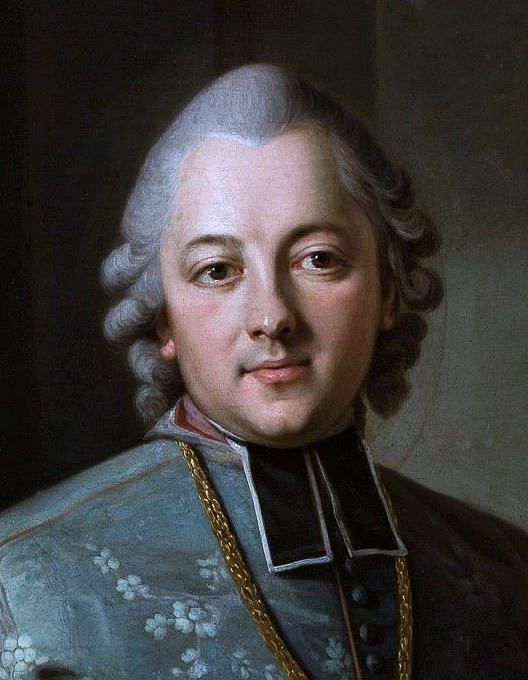
Ignacy Krasicki

The novel does not have much of a plot, it has been described as "unashamedly utilitarian", more of a "didactic treatise", almost a manifesto of Krasicki's reformist ideals.

The titular hero, a local noble holding the office of podstoli in his land, is a model szlachta noble-landowner, as imagined by the Enlightened conservatism ideals. Krasicki often compares the order of his home and estate with the customs and life of the Polish Sarmatian countryside.

The novel's message is the need for moral restoration, criticizing both the slavish keeping of old traditions, as well as reckless abandonment of them in exchange for the foreign novel customs. For the novel's role model, being a noble is not just a case of being born into the class, a proper noble should act in specific way. One of the Enlightened themes of the novel can be seen in its treatment of peasants serfs, whom the main character sees as human beings, with potential of achieving freedom through education.

The novel's protagonist is an unnamed narrator, who in Part 1 spends several weeks in the house of Podstoli, located somewhere in the Lesser Poland. In Part 2 he returns to his village, to implement reforms based on the model he has seen in Podstoli's village. In Part 3 he returns to Podstoli's manor for a wedding of his daughter.

== Significance ==
Pan Podstoli was seen as one of the first Polish novels (incidentally Krasicki was also the one to publish the first one, The Adventures of Mr. Nicholas Wisdom, in 1776), and is one of the most important works by Krasicki. It served as an inspiration future Polish novelists and other writers, including Adam Mickiewicz, who likely drew upon it in his representation of idealized noble life portrayed in his Pan Tadeusz (1834).

The work has spawned a number of similar works in Poland (1786 Ksiądz Pleban and 1788 Obywatel by Józef Kazimierz Kossakowski and 1786 Pani Podczaszyna by Michał Dymitr Krajewski) and even a sequel (Pan Podstolic by Edward Tomasz Massalski published in five parts in the period 1831–1833).

== See also ==
- The Adventures of Mr. Nicholas Wisdom
- Fables and Parables
