= Adam Stanisław Grabowski =

- Prince-Bishop of Warmia
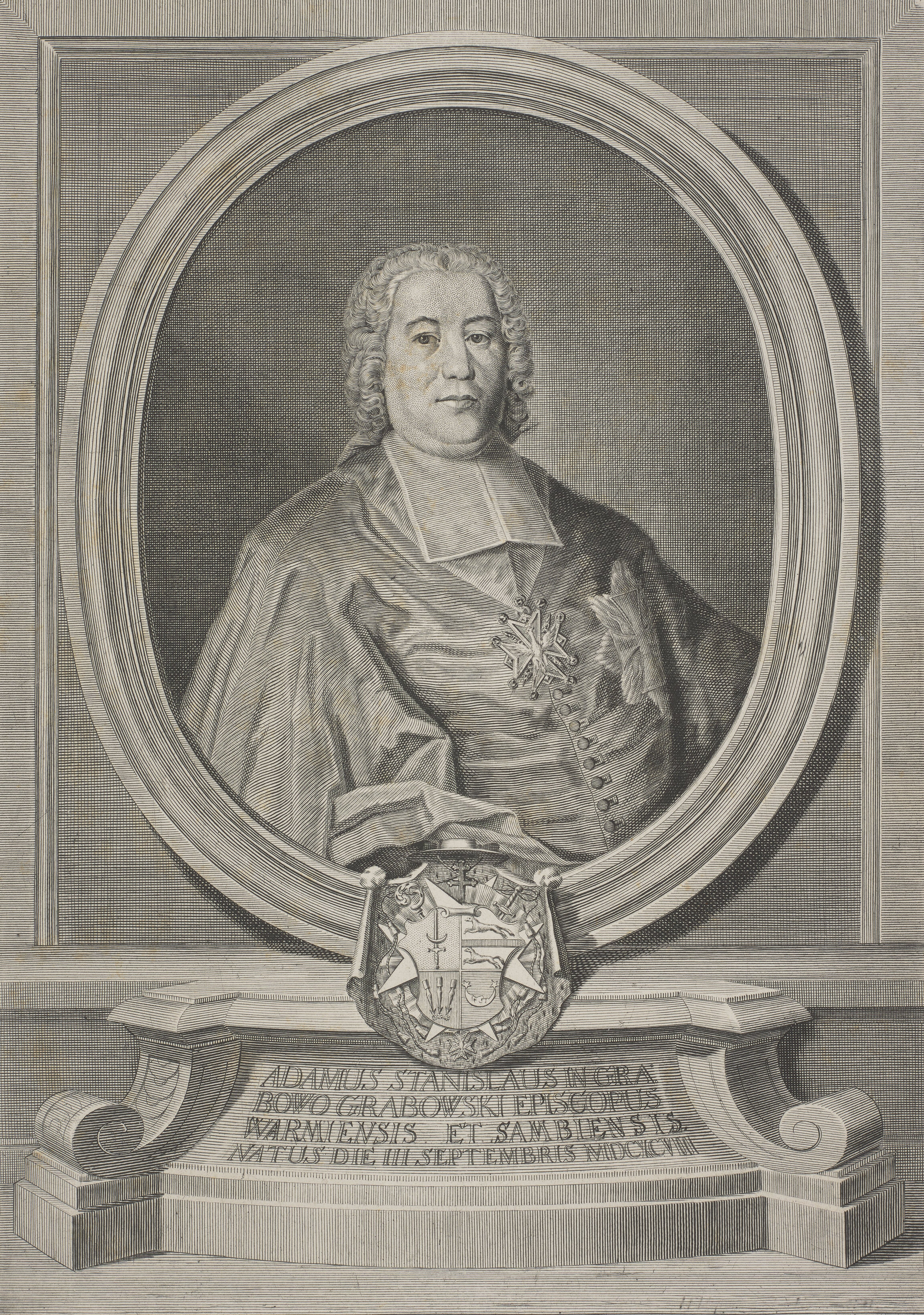
- Church: Catholic Church
- Diocese: Diocese of Warmia
- In office: 18 September 1741 – 15 December 1766
- Predecessor: Krzysztof Jan Szembek
- Successor: Ignacy Krasicki
- Previous posts: Bishop of Włocławek (1739-1741); Bishop of Chelmno (1736-1739); Titular Bishop of Nilopolis (1733-1736); Auxiliary Bishop of Poznań (1733-1736)

Orders
- Ordination: 26 November 1730
- Consecration: 16 August 1733 by Stanisław Józef Hozjusz

Personal details
- Born: 3 September 1698 Wielki Buczek, Kalisz Voivodeship, Crown of the Kingdom of Poland, Kingdom of Poland and the Grand Duchy of Lithuania
- Died: 15 December 1766 (aged 68) Lidzbark Warmiński, Prince-Bishopric of Warmia, Crown of the Kingdom of Poland, Kingdom of Poland and the Grand Duchy of Lithuania

Adam Stanisław Grabowski (Latin: Adamus Stanislaus Grabowski; 3 September 1698, Wielki Buczek, near Debrzno – 15 December 1766, Lidzbark Warmiński), of the Zbiświcz coat-of-arms, was Bishop of Chełmno 1736–1739, Bishop of Kujawy 1739–1741, Prince-Bishop of Warmia 1741–1766.

== Life ==
Grabowski was the son of Schlochau assessor (Człuchów iudex terrestris district judge) Andreas Theodor Grabowski and his wife Barbara Sofia von Kleist. He attended Jesuit schools in Conitz (now Chojnice) and Thorn (Toruń), then studied law in Rome. For a time he was a court scribe (pisarz sądowy) in Skarszewy, then was secretary to Crown Deputy Chancellor Andrzej Lipski and became an official in the Crown Chancellery.

In 1730 Grabowski took holy orders and, as a trusted associate of Chancellor Jan Aleksander (?) Lipski, quickly accumulated lucrative benefices. He received canonicates in Lwów and Włocławek, a deanery in Chełmno, and presbyteries in Jaworowo, Skaryszew, and Tujce. In 1733 he became the Poznań suffragan.

During the 1733–34 interregnum, Grabowski backed August III, later taking part in his coronation. In 1734 he worked to win the Royal Prussia szlachta (nobility) for August III, then was the king's envoy to Rome, where he obtained Pope Clement XIII's support for August III's election as King of Poland.

As a reward for his mission to Rome, in 1736 Grabowski was appointed Bishop of Chełmno. In 1737 he returned to Poland. In 1739 he was transferred to the more lucrative Kujawy Bishopric. He participated actively in the 1738 and 1740 sejms (parliaments). On 14 April 1741 he was preconized Bishop of Warmia.

Grabowski allied himself with the Czartoryski Familia and carried out in Royal Prussia the court's policy of blocking the general sejmiks. In 1743–44 he was president of the Radom Treasury Tribunal. In a speech before the Grodno Sejm in 1744, he conditioned an expansion of the army on improvement in the national economy. He participated in the sejms of 1746 and 1748.

In 1749 he was royal commissioner in Danzig (Gdańsk), where he resolved disputes between the Council and the burgher opposition. From 1746 he headed a commission that oversaw the reconstruction of a sluice dividing the Vistula River into the Nogat and Leniwka Rivers.

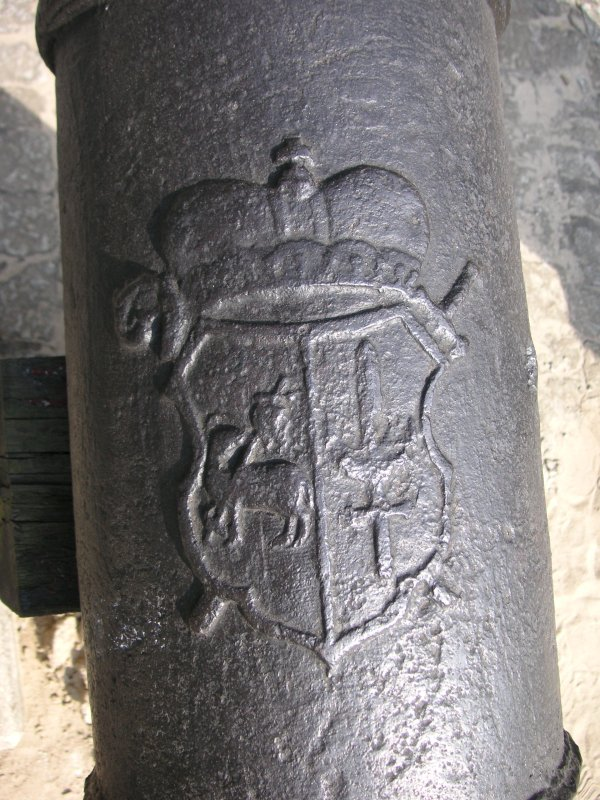
Bishop Grabowski's coat-of-arms on a gun he commissioned. Polish Army Museum, Warsaw.

During the Seven Years' War, Grabowski gave financial assistance to King August III and sought to protect Warmia from armies marching across her territory. In the face of mounting conflict between the Czartoryskis and the royal court, he declared in favor of the King and gradually withdrew from politics, maintaining his neutrality in a dispute between "Prussian patriots" and Pomeranian Governor (Wojewoda) Paweł Mostowski. During the 1763–64 interregnum, he recognized Stanisław August Poniatowski as king. In 1765 he sold his Warsaw palace for a national mint. At King Stanisław August's request, not long before his death in 1766 he accepted Ignacy Krasicki as his coadjutor with right of succession.

During his reign over Warmia, Grabowski was the first to use the metropolitan's pallium and cross, granted in Pope Benedict XIV's bull of 24 September 1742. Bishop Grabowski was a good husbandman and patron of the arts. At a 1748 conference of cities, he brought about a revision of 1718 tax rates and a more equitable distribution of fiscal burdens. At a conference of Warmia estates in Wormditt (Orneta) on 4 July 1766, he issued ordinances regulating the everyday lives of Warmians in relation to agriculture, trade and crafts. The ordinances had been discussed with the Warmia chapter. In the realm of cartography and land reclamation he collaborated with Jan Suchodolec, son of a Protestant Polish Brother who had found refuge at Alt Rosenthal (today Stara Różanka), near Rastenburg (today Kętrzyn) in the Lutheran Kingdom of Prussia.

At Grabowski's initiative, the chapel at Heilsberg Lidzbark Castle received a Rococo decor, and before the castle's eastern wing there appeared a new structure, "Grabowski's palace." Grabowski also founded a church at Franknowo, financed the rebuilding of churches in Lamkowo, Bisztynek and Königsberg, and bestowed main altars upon the Dobre Miasto collegiate church, St. Nicholas' Church in Elbing (Elbląg), and Frauenburg Frombork Cathedral. Grabowski also restored the bishops' summer residence at Smolajny.

He gave financial support to Stanisław Konarski's initiatives such as the Collegium Nobilium. He maintained close contacts with men of learning such as Jan Daniel Janocki. He passed on to Gottfried Lengnich for printing a 1426 manuscript of Kadłubek's Chronicles that he had found, and the "Heilsberg manuscript" of Gallus Anonymus. It was thanks to Grabowski that Johann Friedrich Endersch's map of the diocese (the Map of Holy Warmia) was published. He himself took an interest in the history of art and gathered extensive collections of books, statues, paintings and porcelain.

He was a representative of the early Catholic Enlightenment in Poland.

Grabowski was interred at Frauenburg, now Frombork Cathedral.

== See also ==
- List of bishops of Warmia
- List of Poles

== Notes ==
Catholic Church titles
Regnal titles
Preceded by Krzysztof Andrzej Jan Szembek	Prince-Bishop of Warmia (Ermland); 1741–1766	Succeeded by Ignacy Krasicki
