= The Wolf and the Lamb =

Aesop's fable

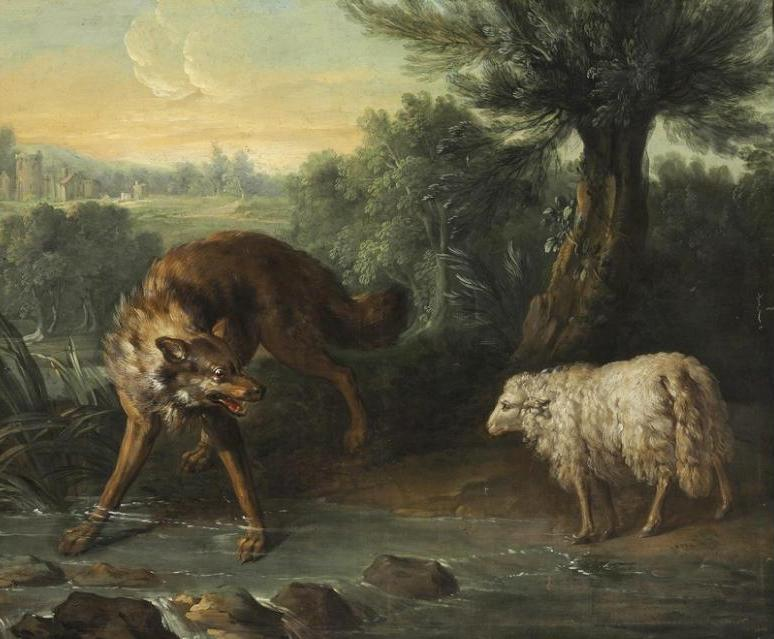
Jean-Baptiste Oudry's oil painting of the fable

The Wolf and the Lamb is a well-known fable of Aesop and is numbered 155 in the Perry Index. There are several variant stories of tyrannical injustice in which a victim is falsely accused and killed despite a reasonable defence.

== The fable and its variants ==
A wolf comes upon a lamb while both are drinking from a stream and, in order to justify taking its life, accuses it of various misdemeanours, all of which the lamb proves to be impossible. Losing patience, the wolf replies that the offences must have been committed by some other member of the lamb's family and that it does not propose to delay its meal by enquiring any further. There are versions of the fable in both the Greek of Babrius and the Latin of Phaedrus, and it was retold in Latin throughout the Middle Ages. The morals drawn there are that the tyrant can always find an excuse for his tyranny and that the unjust will not listen to the reasoning of the innocent.

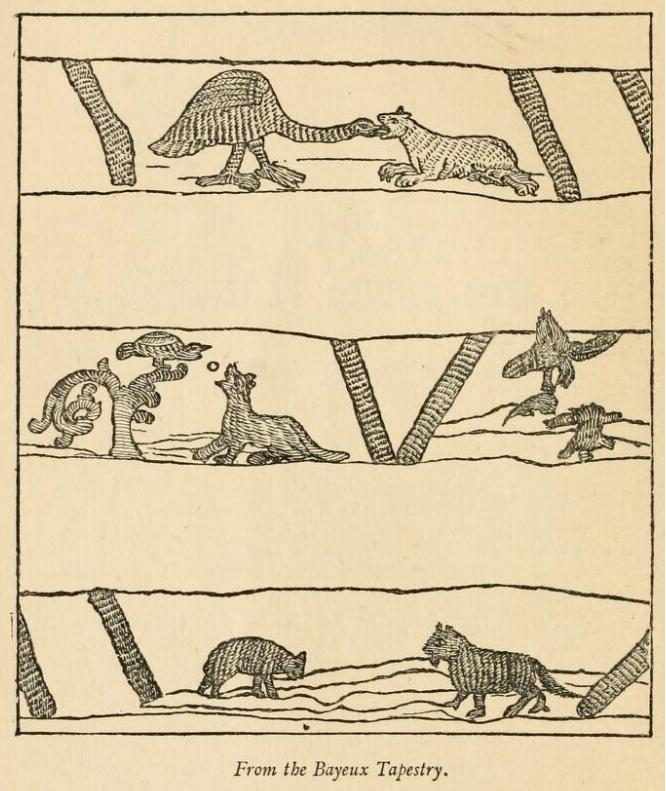
Three of Aesop's fables on the 11th-century Bayeux Tapestry, with The Wolf and the Lamb at bottom

In his 1692 retelling of the fable, Roger L'Estrange used the English proverb "'Tis an easy Matter to find a Staff to beat a Dog" to sum up the sentiment that any arbitrary excuse will suit the powerful. At a slightly earlier date, Jean de la Fontaine began his very similar version of the story with the moral summary of its meaning, La raison du plus fort est toujours la meilleure (The strongest side always carries the argument). The line eventually became proverbial in French and was glossed with the alternative English proverb, "Might makes right", as its equivalent. Ivan Krylov's translation of the French was likewise close and has given the Russian language two proverbs. The first, "The stronger always blames the weaker" ("У сильного всегда бессильный виноват"), is taken from the poem's first line. The second idiomatic usage is provided by the wolf's final reply to the lamb's reasoning, "My need of food is guilt enough of yours" ("Ты виноват уж тем, что хочется мне кушать"), and is used ironically of someone casting around to find blame, no matter what justice demands.

A variant story attributed to Aesop exists in Greek sources. This is the fable of the cock and the cat, which is separately numbered 16 in the Perry Index. Seeking a reasonable pretext to kill the cock, the cat accuses it of waking people early in the morning and then of incest with its sisters and daughters. In both cases, the cock answers that humanity benefits by its activities. But the cat ends the argument by remarking that it is now her breakfast time and "Cats don't live on dialogues". Underlying both these fables is a Latin proverb, variously expressed, that "an empty belly has no ears" or, as the Spanish equivalent has it, "Lobo hambriento no tiene asiento" (a hungry wolf doesn't hang about).

The fable also has Eastern analogues. One of these is the Buddhist Dipi Jataka in which the protagonists are a panther and a goat. The goat has strayed into the presence of a panther and tries to avert its fate by greeting the predator politely. It is accused of treading on his tail and then of scaring off his prey, for which crime it is made to substitute. A similar story involving birds is found among Bidpai's Persian fables as "The Partridge and the Hawk". The unjust accusation there is that the partridge is taking up all the shade, leaving the hawk out in the hot sun. When the partridge points out that it is midnight, it is killed by the hawk for contradicting.

== Moral applications ==
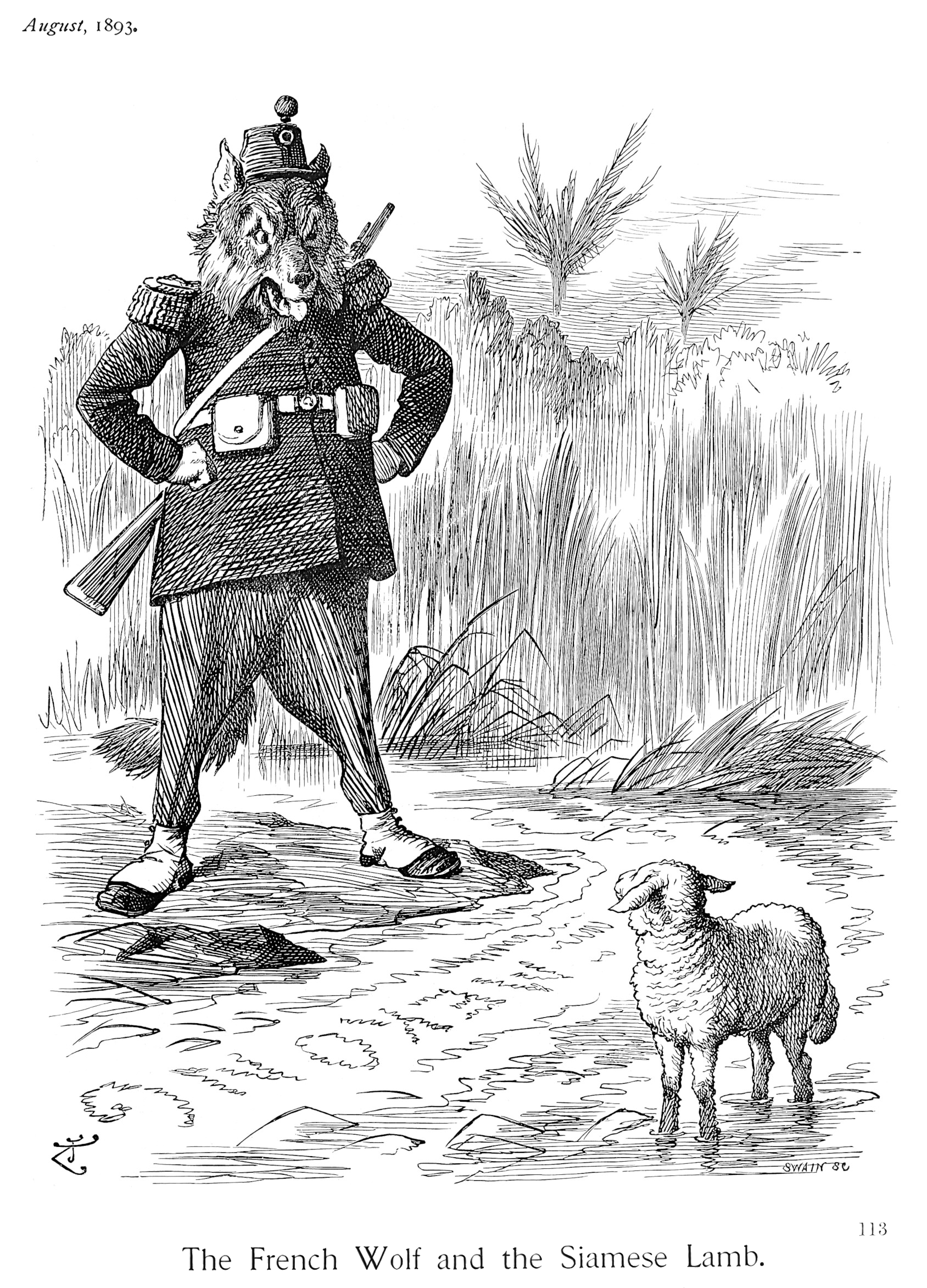
The French Wolf and the Siamese Lamb (1893)

Down the centuries, interpreters of the fable have applied it to injustices prevalent in their own times. The 15th-century Moral Fables by Scottish poet Robert Henryson depict widespread social breakdown. The Lamb appeals to natural law, to Scripture, and to statutory law, and is answered by the Wolf with perversions of all these. Then Henryson in his own person comments that there are three kinds of contemporary wolves who oppress the poor: dishonest lawyers; landowners intent on extending their estates; and aristocrats who exploit their tenants.

During the 1893 Franco-Siamese crisis, Punch published a satirical cartoon by John Tenniel titled "The French Wolf and the Siamese Lamb" which mocked French intentions towards the Kingdom of Siam. The cartoon depicts a wolf in French Army uniform eyeing a Siamese lamb across the Mekong. Much earlier, the fable's presence in the borders of the 11th-century Bayeux Tapestry (see above) has suggested a similar political comment being made by the English embroiderers to express their dissent and horror at the 1066 Norman Conquest.

== Artistic applications ==
The story was among those included in La Fontaine's Fables (I.10) and was set to music by several French composers, including

- Louis-Nicolas Clérambault at the start of the 18th century.
- Alfred Yung (1836–1913), a setting for two equal voices (1862)
- Louis Lacombe, among his Fables de La Fontaine (Op. 72 1875)
- Charles Lecocq in Six Fables de Jean de la Fontaine for voice and piano (1900)
- André Caplet in Trois Fables de Jean de la Fontaine for voice and piano (1919)
- Marie-Madeleine Duruflé (1921–1999) in 6 Fables de La Fontaine for female a cappella choir (1960)
- Isabelle Aboulker in Les Fables enchantées (1979)
- Claude Ballif, the last of his Chansonettes : 5 Fables de La Fontaine for small mixed choir (Op. 72, Nº1 1995)
- Vladimir Cosma, as the eighth piece in Eh bien ! Dansez maintenant (2006), a light-hearted interpretation for narrator and orchestra in the style of a pasodoble
- Sacha Chaban, a setting for orchestra and recitation (2012)

La Fontaine's fable in Catalan translation is part of Xavier Benguerel i Godó's Siete Fabulas de La Fontaine for recitation with orchestral accompaniment. But it was Martin Luther's German translation, Fabel Vom Wolf und Lämmlein that Hans Poser set for male choir and accompaniment in his Die Fabeln des Äsop (Op. 28, 1956). A ballet based upon the fable was choreographed in 2004 by Béatrice Massin for the composite presentation of Annie Sellem, Les Fables à La Fontaine. This was interpreted to the Baroque music of Marin Marais.

The fable was also the subject of several paintings by Jean-Baptiste Oudry, including one over the door in the Grand Cabinet du Dauphin in the Palace of Versailles (1747) and a canvas currently held in the Museums of Metz. In the 19th century it was made the subject of a statue by Hippolyte Heizler (1828–71), currently in the Le Mans botanical garden, in which the wolf looks down threateningly at the diminutive lamb. Later the fable figured on two French stamps: first was a 1938 portrait of La Fontaine with the tale illustrated in a panel below it; there was also a six-stamp strip issued in 1995 to commemorate the third centenary of La Fontaine's death, in which the lamb is shown as startled by the wolf's reflection in the water. In 1977 Burundi issued a four-stamp block of fables where the designs are based on Gustave Doré's illustrations, of which this fable is one.

== See also ==
- "The Lamb and the Wolves", in Ignacy Krasicki, Fables and Parables (1779)
