= Michał Dymitr Krajewski =

Polish writer (1746–1817)

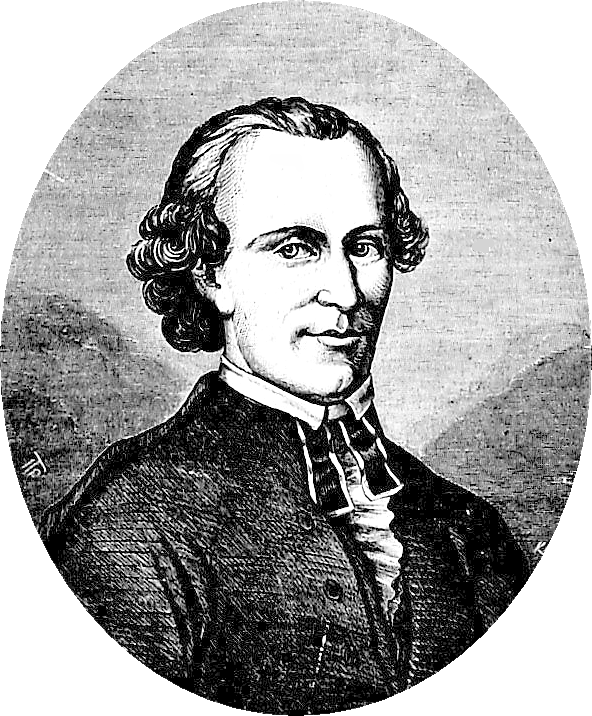

Michał Dymitr Tadeusz Krajewski (8 September 1746 – 5 July 1817), sometimes also referred to as Dymitr M. Krajewski, was a Polish writer and educational activist of the times of the Enlightenment in Poland. His 1784 book Podolanka became the most debated and published Polish novel of that year, and his next book, Wojciech Zdarzyński, is considered to be the first Polish science-fiction novel.

== Biography ==
Krajewski (coat of arms Jasieńczyk) was born in the Rus Voivodeship, on 8 September 1746. On 22 July 1763, he joined the order of Piarists in Podoliniec, where he gained the name of Dymitr. After his novitiate he studied rhetoric and philosophy in Międzyrzecze Koreckie. From 1769, he attended the Piarists college in Warsaw and in 1782 he became a prefect of Collegium Nobilium. Author of several books and other literary works, he was supported by the Church itself. In 1788, he took the rectory in Białaczów. In 1793, he left the priesthood and settled in Końskie. In 1809, he moved to Warsaw, where he joined the Society of Friends of Science (Towarzystwo Przyjaciół Nauk).

== Works ==
Krajewski's writings concentrated on social issues and political debate about the need to reform the Polish–Lithuanian Commonwealth (along the lines suggested by Jean-Jacques Rousseau). He was the supporter of the reformists idea, especially in the area of the education (like the reforms of the Commission of National Education, first ministry of education in the world).

His first book published in 1784 was the Podolanka wychowana w stanie natury, życie i przypadki swoje opisująca (The Podolian Girl: raised in the natural state, describing her life and events), inspired by French book by Henri Joseph Du Laurens (Imirce, ou la fille de la nature). The main hero, a female, criticizes humanity's efforts to destroy and subordinate nature. Podolanka initiated the first literary debate in Poland and had seven editions in one year.

In 1785, he published another book, the Wojciech Zdarzyński życie i przypadki swoje opisujący (Wojciech Zdarzynski - life and adventures of himself describing) - about the adventures of a young Pole who uses a balloon to visit a utopian country on the Moon. The book is considered the first Polish science-fiction book. Krajewski published a sequel to it in 1786 - Pani Podczaszyna. Tom drugi Przypadków Wojciecha Zdarzyńskiego (Cup-Bearers's wife. Second tome of adventures of Wojciech Zdarzynski). Those books were influenced by the earlier works of bishop Ignacy Krasicki, who is recognized as the author of the first Polish novel (Mikołaja Doświadczyńskiego przypadki, 1776).

Near the end of his life Krajewski wrote a historical work Dzieje panowania Jana Kazimierza od roku 1656 do jego abdykacji w roku 1668 (Times of reign of Jan Kazimierz from 1656 to his abdication in 1668). The first volume was published in 1846; the second was lost. This book was part of the Society of Friends of Science project aimed at compiling a modern history of Poland. Among his other historical books was one about hetman Stefan Czarniecki (1830).
