= O Sacred Love of the Beloved Country =

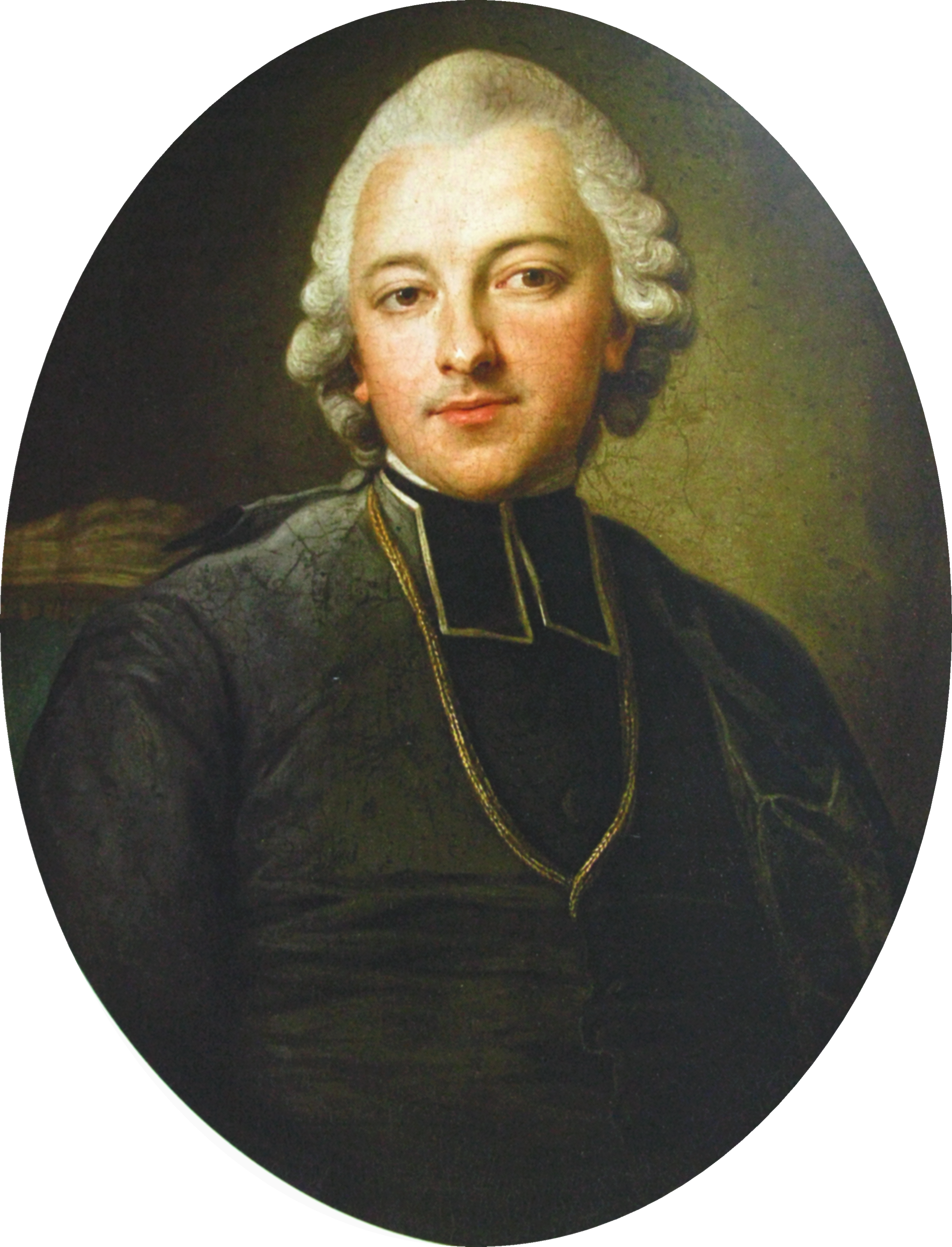
Ignacy Krasicki, Prince-Bishop of Warmia, ca. 1768

"O Sacred Love of the Beloved Country" (Polish: Święta miłości kochanej ojczyzny), also known as "Hymn to the Love of the Country" (Hymn do miłości ojczyzny), is a patriotic poem by the Polish Enlightenment author and poet, Ignacy Krasicki, published in 1774.

It became one of Poland's national anthems.

== History ==
Ignacy Krasicki (1735–1801) was the leading literary representative of the Polish Enlightenment—a prose writer and poet highly esteemed by his contemporaries, who admired his works for their plots, wit, imagination and fluid style.

Krasicki read his poem, "O Sacred Love," at a Thursday Dinner hosted by King Stanisław August Poniatowski. The poet published it in 1774 in Zabawy Przyjemne i Pożyteczne (Pastimes Pleasant and Profitable). It subsequently became part of song 9 of his 1775 mock-heroic poem, "Myszeida" (The Mouseiad).

Popular during the Enlightenment, Krasicki's patriotic poem became the anthem of the Warsaw Corps of Cadets. It has gone through many translations, including three into French.

== Text and translation ==
Święta miłości kochanej ojczyzny,
Czują cię tylko umysły poczciwe!
Dla ciebie zjadłe smakują trucizny,
Dla ciebie więzy, pęta niezelżywe.
Kształcisz kalectwo przez chwalebne blizny,
Gnieździsz w umyśle rozkoszy prawdziwe,
Byle cię można wspomóc, byle wspierać,
Nie żal żyć w nędzy, nie żal i umierać.

Translation:

O sacred love of the beloved Country,
Only minds good and true can experience you!
Consumed for thee, rank poisons be savory;
Worn for thee, chains and fetters be no abuse.
Thou embellish cripples with scars of glory;
In the mind, thou dost nestle pleasures most true.
Might one, to thy succor, endeavor to fly,
'Twere nothing to live poor, 'twere nothing to die.

— Translated by Christopher Kasparek

The poem is written in lines of 11 syllables, in ottava rima (rhyme scheme AB AB AB CC).

== See also ==
- Polish national anthems
- Fables and Parables
- Polish literature
- Polish Enlightenment
