= Smolajny =

- Village
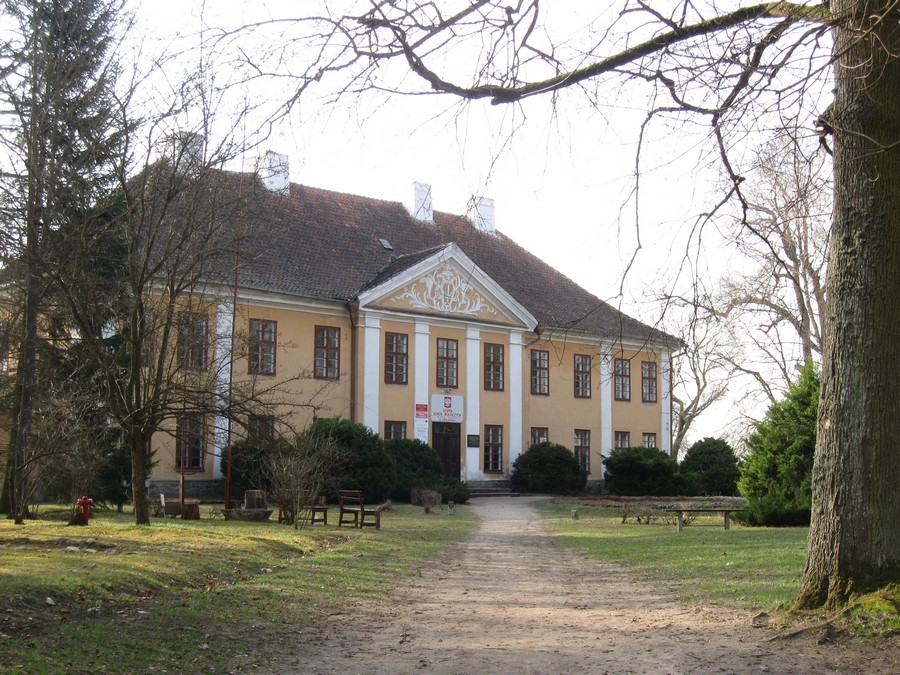
- Summer palace of the bishops of Warmia in Smolajny

- Location within Poland
- Coordinates: 54°1′42″N 20°24′23″E
- Country: Poland
- Voivodeship: Warmian-Masurian
- County: Olsztyn
- Gmina: Dobre Miasto

Population
  - Total: 720
- Time zone: UTC+1 (CET)
  - Summer (DST): UTC+2 (CEST)
- Vehicle registration: NOL

Smolajny [smɔˈlai̯nɨ] (formerly Smołowo) is a village in the administrative district of Gmina Dobre Miasto, within Olsztyn County, Warmian-Masurian Voivodeship, in northern Poland.

== History ==
The village was founded in 1290 by Bishop of Warmia Heinrich Fleming. From 1350 it served as the summer residence of the prince-bishops of Warmia. It was destroyed by war in 1414, 1454, 1519–21 and 1709 and was rebuilt each time. In 1454, it was incorporated to Poland by King Casimir IV Jagiellon upon the request of the anti-Teutonic Prussian Confederation, and confirmed as part of Poland in 1466. It was the favourite summer residence of leading Polish Enlightenment poet Ignacy Krasicki. It was annexed by Prussia in the First Partition of Poland in 1772, and from 1871 it also formed part of Germany. In 1945, after the defeat of Nazi Germany in World War II, Smolajny became again part of Poland.

In 1975–98 Smolajny belonged administratively to Olsztyn Voivodeship.

== Monuments ==
Located in Smolajny is a former summer palace of the bishops of Warmia built in 1741–46 in the Rococo style by Prince-Bishop Adam Stanisław Grabowski. The palace became the favorite residence of the famous satirist and fabulist, future Prince-Bishop Ignacy Krasicki, who had served as Bishop Grabowski's coadjutor. Krasicki established there a beautiful park and built a gate tower (1765). The palace building is now used by an agricultural school.

The village also features 18th- and 19th-century houses.
