= Zbiór potrzebniejszych wiadomości =

Polish encyclopedia

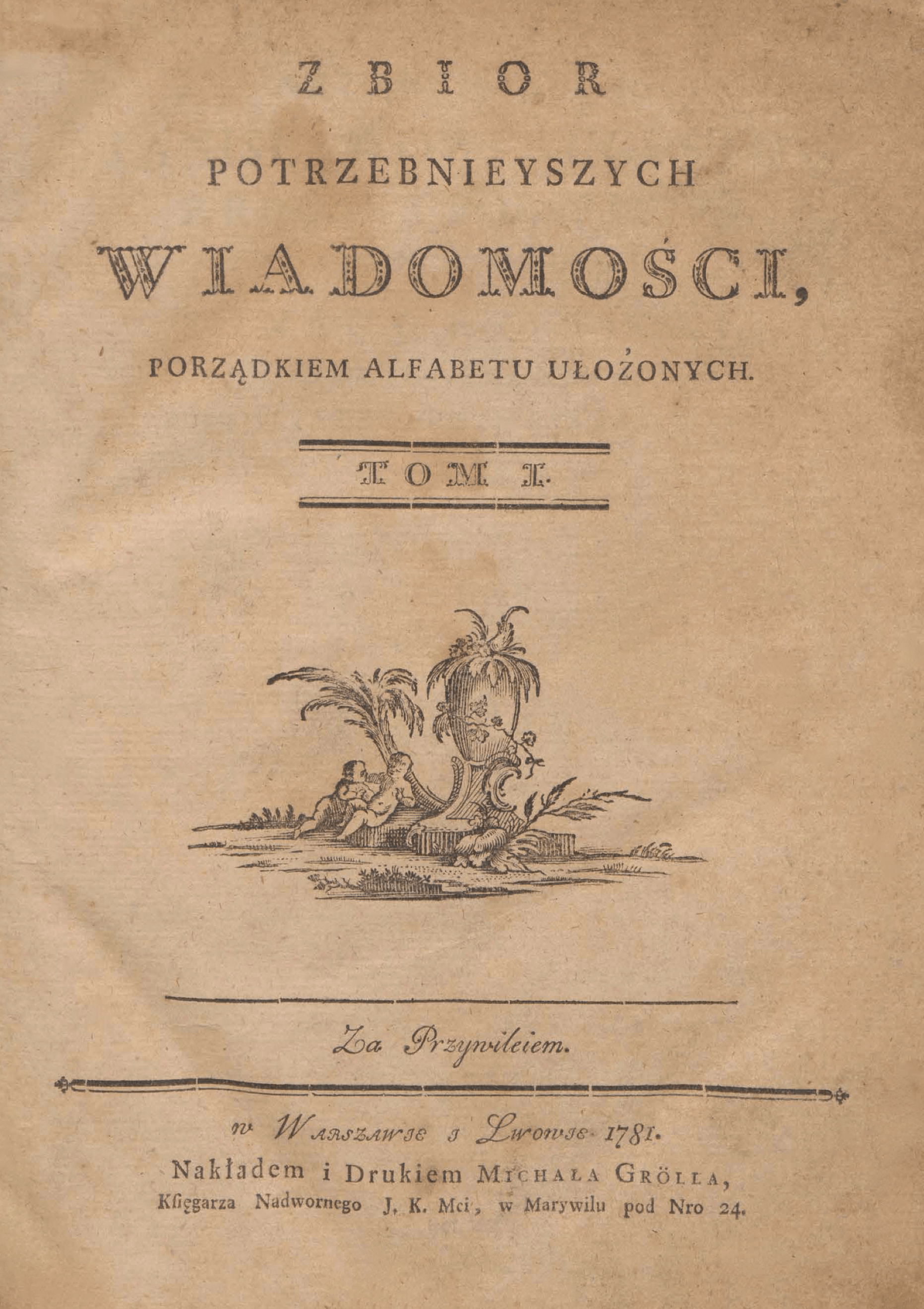
Krasicki's A Collection of Essential Information (vol. I, 1781)

Zbiór potrzebniejszych wiadomości (A Collection of Essential Information), a two-volume work by Ignacy Krasicki published 1781–83, was one of the first Polish encyclopedias.

== History ==
Krasicki's Polish encyclopedia followed Jan Protasowicz's Inventores rerum (1608), Stanisław Stokowski's Encyclopaedia Natvralis Entis (1637), and Benedykt Chmielowski's Nowe Ateny (The New Athens, 1745).

The Polish poet and writer Ignacy Krasicki was inspired to produce his encyclopedia by the work of the French Encyclopédistes, including Denis Diderot, Jean le Rond d'Alembert, and Voltaire, whom he had met while visiting France.

Krasicki later expanded his Collection, which eventually reached six volumes that were published in Warsaw after his death as part of a collected edition of Krasicki's works. The six-volume edition, published in 1828–33 by Adam Jakubowski, was printed by Natan Glücksberg.

== Bibliography ==
- Krasicki, Ignacy (1781). Zbiór potrzebniejszych wiadomości t. I-II [A Collection of Essential Information] (in Polish). Warsaw: nakładem Michała Grölla.
- Rzadkowska, Ewa (1955). Encyklopedia i Diderot w polskim oświeceniu Tom 24 z Studia historycznoliterackie [The Encyclopedia and Diderot in the Polish Enlightenment, vol. 24 of Historical and Literary Studies] (in Polish). Warszawa: Zakład im. Ossolińskich. ISSN 0554-5692.
