= The Adventures of Mr. Nicholas Wisdom =

1776 novel by Ignacy Krasicki

The Adventures of Mr. Nicholas Empiricus
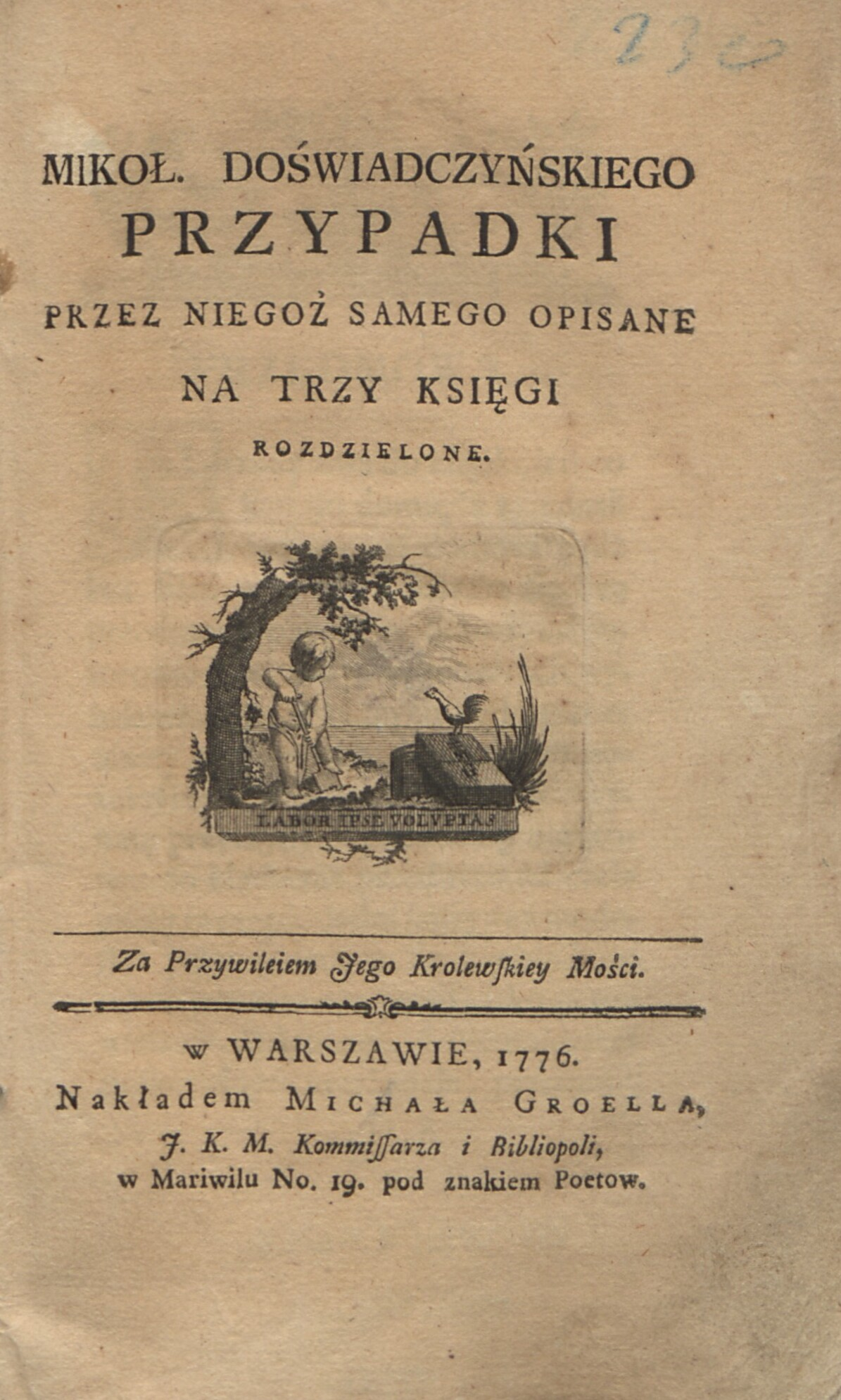
- Author: Ignacy Krasicki
- Original title: Mikołaja Doświadczyńskiego przypadki
- Language: Polish
- Genre: Novel
- Publication date: 1776
- Publication place: Poland
- Media type: Print (Hardback)

The Adventures of Mr. Nicholas Wisdom (Polish: Mikołaja Doświadczyńskiego przypadki; in English, more accurately, The Adventures of Nicholas Empiricus), written in Polish in 1776 by Ignacy Krasicki, is the first novel composed in the Polish language, and a milestone in Polish literature.

== Plot ==
Krasicki's novel is the tale of Nicholas Experience (Mikołaj Doświadczyński), a Polish nobleman. During sojourns in Warsaw, Paris, and the fictional island of Nipu (a utopian society), the protagonist gathers numerous experiences that lead him to a rationalist outlook and teach him how to become a good man, and thus a good citizen.

This rationalist outlook, often emphasized in Krasicki's writings, constitutes an apologia for the Enlightenment and physiocratism. The Adventures of Nicholas Experience offers a portrayal both of the 18th-century Polish–Lithuanian Commonwealth and of the broader European culture of the time.

== See also ==
- Fables and Parables
- Monitor (Polish newspaper)
