= Anselm of Meissen =

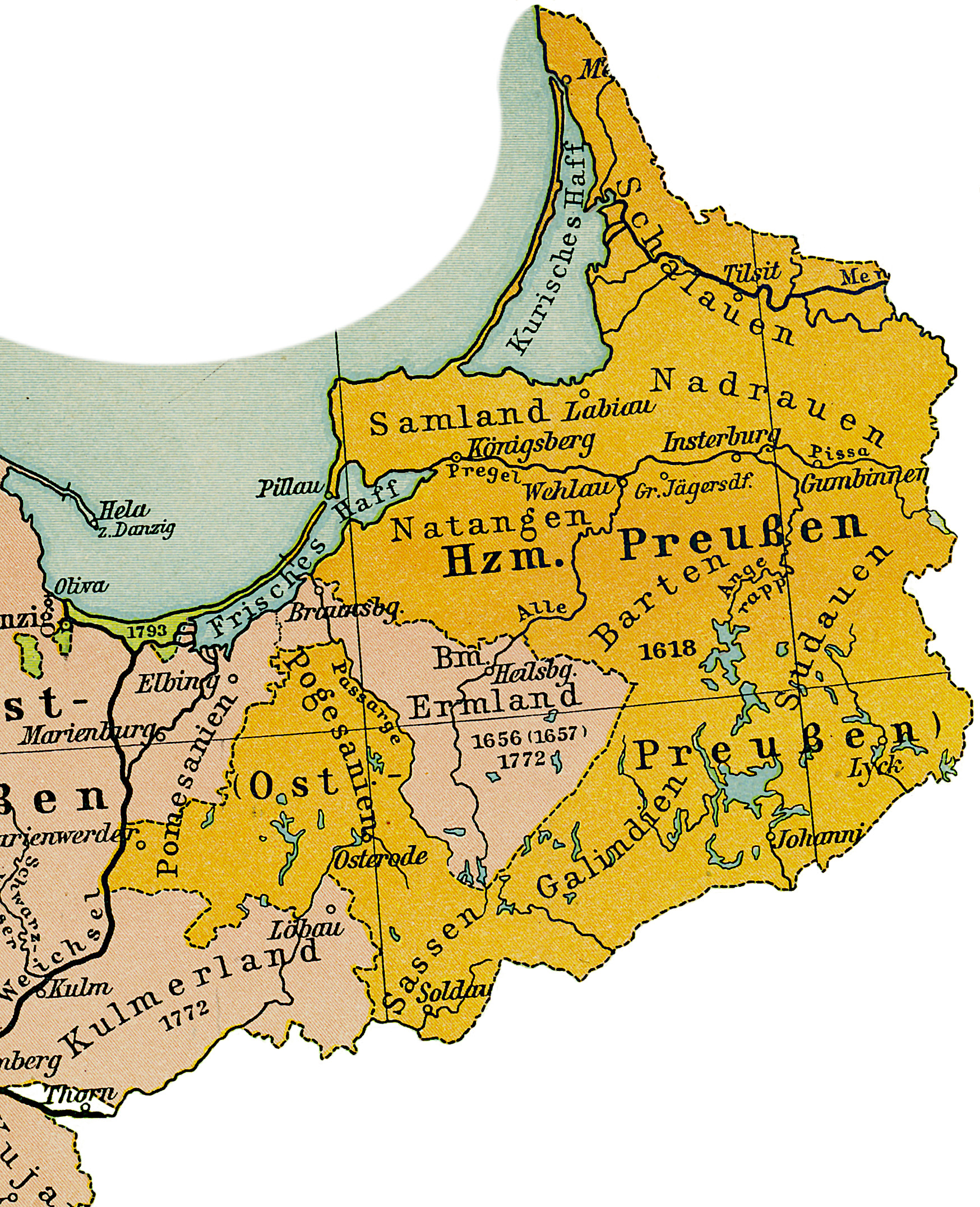
Ermland in Prussia

Anselm of Meissen (German: Anselm von Meißen, died no later than 1278 in Elbing (Elbląg)) was a priest of the Teutonic Order and the first actual Bishop of Warmia (Varmia, Ermland, or Ermeland).

As his name suggests, Anselm originated from Meißen. He became a priest in or before 1245.

In Prussia, which was still mainly inhabited by heathen Old Prussians, the Prince-Bishopric of Warmia had been created in 1243 by the papal legate William of Modena, along with bishoprics of Culm, Pomesania, and Samland. These four dioceses came under the rule of the appointed Archbishop of Prussia. Several bishops at that time, including Anselm, were priests of the Teutonic Order which undertook the ongoing Prussian Crusade in the East.

Heinrich of Strateich, the first elected Bishop of Warmia, was unable to claim his office. On 28. August 1250 in Valenciennes (Flanders), Anselm of Meissen was consacred by Petrus de Collemed (Pietro of Albano), and at least since 27. April 1251, Anselm was present in Warmia.

The bishop ruled one-third of his exempt bishopric also as a secular ruler for his support. His status as a prince of the Holy Roman Empire was confirmed in the Golden Bull of Emperor Charles IV. The other part was governed by the Order, with the bishop having clerical jurisdiction there. The borders were drawn in 1254. This was confirmed by the Golden Bull of 1356. The chapter with 16 canons had the right to elect independently the bishop. It resided at Braunsberg (Braniewo), with the St. Andreas church having become the bishops cathedral in 1260. Following attacks by heathen Old Prussians in 1262, the see was eventually moved to Frauenburg in 1280 by Anselm's successor, Heinrich Fleming.

In 1261, Pope Urban IV appointed Anselm as legate to Bohemia and Moravia, Riga, Gnesen and Salzburg. Anselm recruited Germans from lower Germany, Moravia and Silesia to settle in Prussia. During the Prussian uprising, he remained in Silesia, and also performed duties there, in Reichenbach, Breslau and in Olmütz (Olomouc).

Anselm died in 1278 in Elbing, where he was buried in the St. Anna chapel in the castle of Elbing.

== See also ==
- List of bishops of Warmia

== Literature ==
- Karl Lohmeyer (1875). "Anselm, Bischof von Ermland". Allgemeine Deutsche Biographie (in German). Vol. 1. Leipzig: Duncker & Humblot. pp. 477–478.
- Reinhold, Gregor (1909). "Ermland" . Catholic Encyclopedia. Vol. 5.

Catholic Church titles
Preceded by (Heinrich von Strateich)	Bishop of Warmia; 1250–1278	Succeeded by Heinrich Fleming
