= Johann Friedrich Endersch =

German mathematician and cartographer (1705–1769)

- Born: October 25, 1705; Dörnfeld an der Heide, Schwarzburg-Rudolstadt
- Died: March 28, 1769 (aged 63); Elbląg, Kingdom of Poland
- Occupation(s): cartographer, mathematician

Johann Friedrich Endersch (25 October 1705 – 28 March 1769) was a German cartographer and mathematician, Royal Mathematician to King Augustus III of Poland.

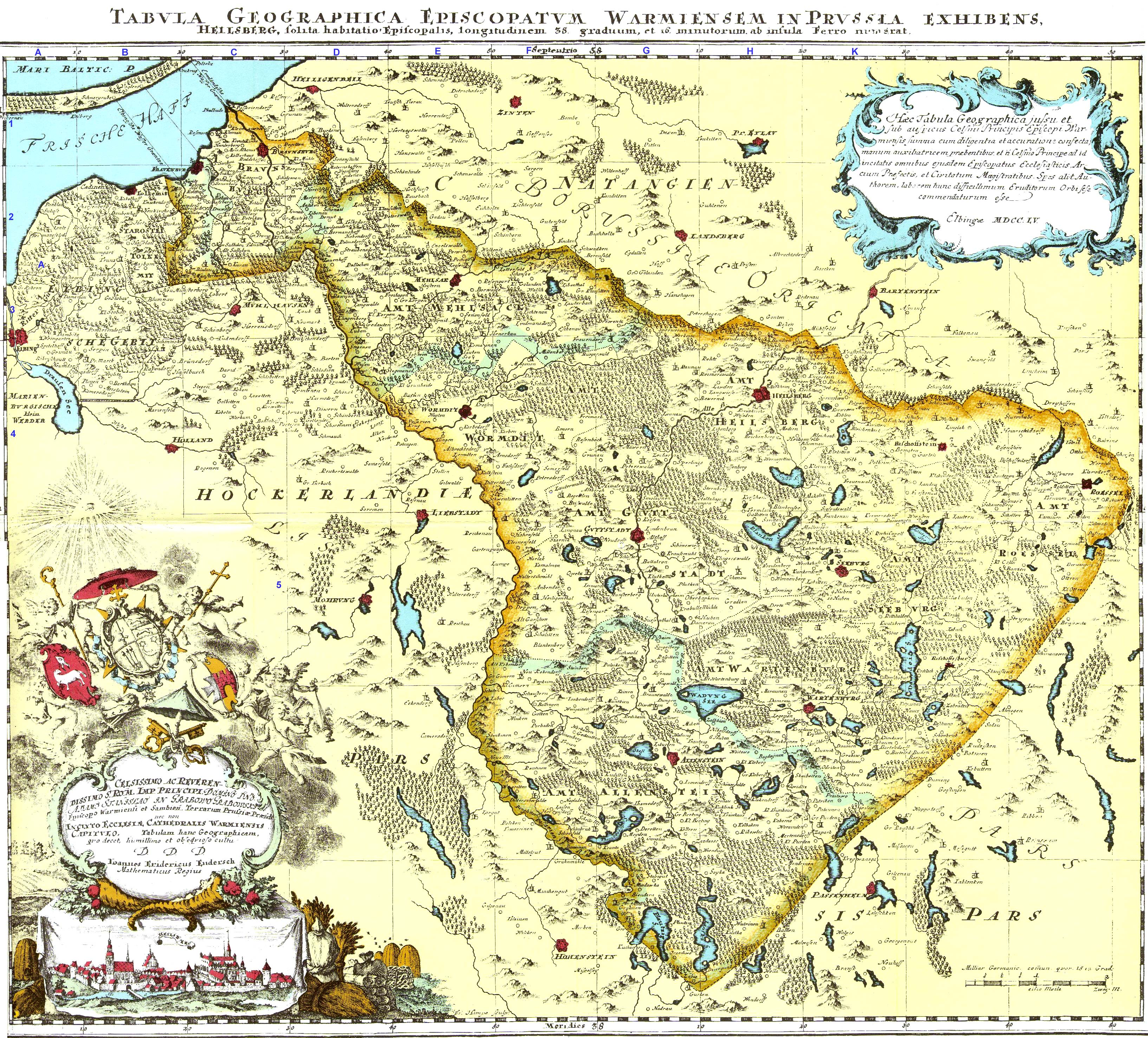
Endersch' 1755 map of Warmia

== Life ==
Endersch was born in Dörnfeld an der Heide, Schwarzburg-Rudolstadt, Thuringia, but lived most of his life in Elbing (Elbląg), Royal Prussia in the Polish–Lithuanian Commonwealth.

In 1755 Endersch completed for Imperial Prince-Bishop Adam Stanisław Grabowski (Celsissimo ac Reverendissimo S. Rom. Imp. Principi Domino Adam Stanislao in Grabowo Grabowski Episcopo Warmiensi et Sambiesi, Terrarum Prussiae Praesidis ...) a map of Warmia titled Tabula Geographica Episcopatum Warmiensem in Prussia Exhibens. The map, detailing the towns of Warmia, was commissioned for the court of Holy Roman Emperor Francis I.

Endersch also made a copper etching that depicted a galiot that had been built in Elbing in 1738 and was named D' Stadt Elbing (German for "City of Elbląg").
