= Johannes Abezier =

Johannes Abezier (c. 1375 – 1424), most usually known as Johann Abezier, was a Roman Catholic religious and political leader of the Teutonic Knights. Abezier was provost of Frauenburg in Warmia (1411), and afterward the Prince-Bishop of Warmia (1418).

== Life ==
Abezier was born in Thorn, (now Toruń) within the monastic state of the Teutonic Knights. Abezier studied Canon Law in the University of Prague since 1394. In the University of Bologna he attained his magister, becoming Doctor Decretorum (1405). He then continued his studies at the University of Vienna. In 1408 he participated in the preparations of the Council of Pisa. Ever, Johannes Abezier was consulted for legal advice, by the successive Grand Masters of the Teutonic Knights.

In 1411, Grand Master Heinrich von Plauen appointed Johannes Abezier as their Procurator General. In that same year, Abezier became provost in the cathedral of Frauenburg (Frombork). In 1414, he participated in a mission to Ofen (now Buda) where King Sigismund was trying to settle the disputes between the state of the Teutonic Knights, and the kingdom of Poland and the grand duchy of Lithuania, after the decisive Battle of Grunwald (1410). By then, Abezier occasionally acted as Auditor Rotae of the Teutonic Knights too. Also in 1414, Johannes Abezier was appointed by the new Grand Master Michael Küchmeister, to travel to the Council of Constance beside the archbishop of Riga, Johann von Wallenrodt, who also was superordinate over Warmia (Ermland). On 13 October 1415, Abezier participated once more in a mission to settle conflicts between the order and Poland, this time in Wileny. He also participated in other diplomatic negotiations, even from Heilsberg years later.

After finishing his duties at Constance, in the summer of 1418 Abezier was formally enthroned as the see of the Prince-Bishopric of Warmia—whose seat was at Heilsberg—, as Prince-Bishop over this territory. His election of 1415 had been unanimous. By then, the territory had been left much destroyed, by the war between both nations. Abezier remained at Heilsberg as the bishop of Ermland, until his death, on February 11, 1424.

== Notes and references ==
Catholic Church titles
Regnal titles
Preceded by Heinrich Heilsberg von Vogelsang	Prince-Bishop of Warmia (Ermland); 1415–1424	Succeeded by Franz Kuhschmalz
