= List of bishops of Warmia =

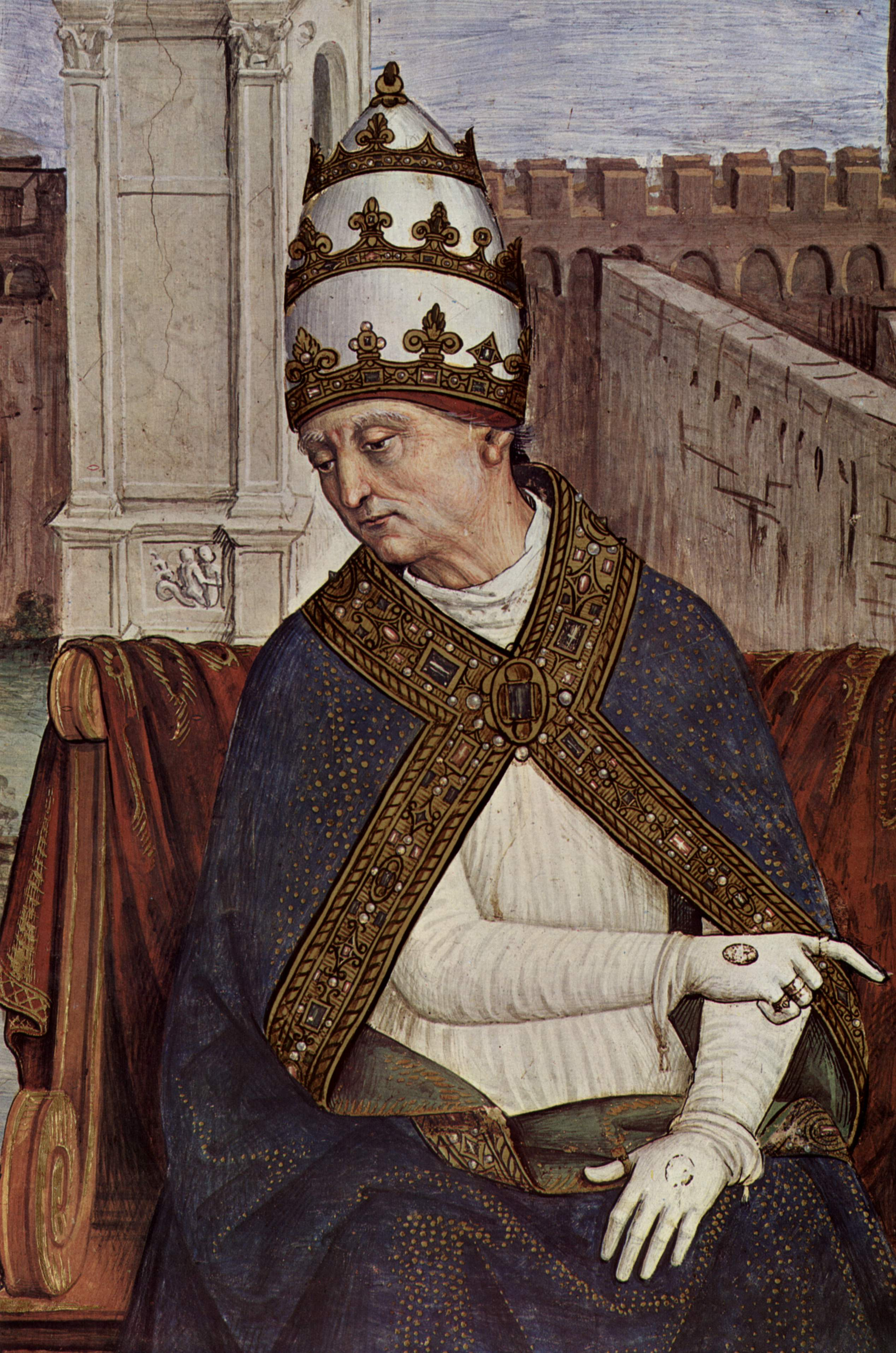
Enea Silvio Piccolomini

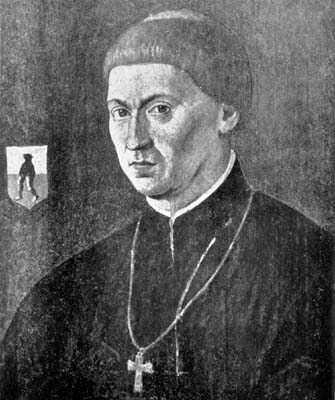
Lucas Watzenrode

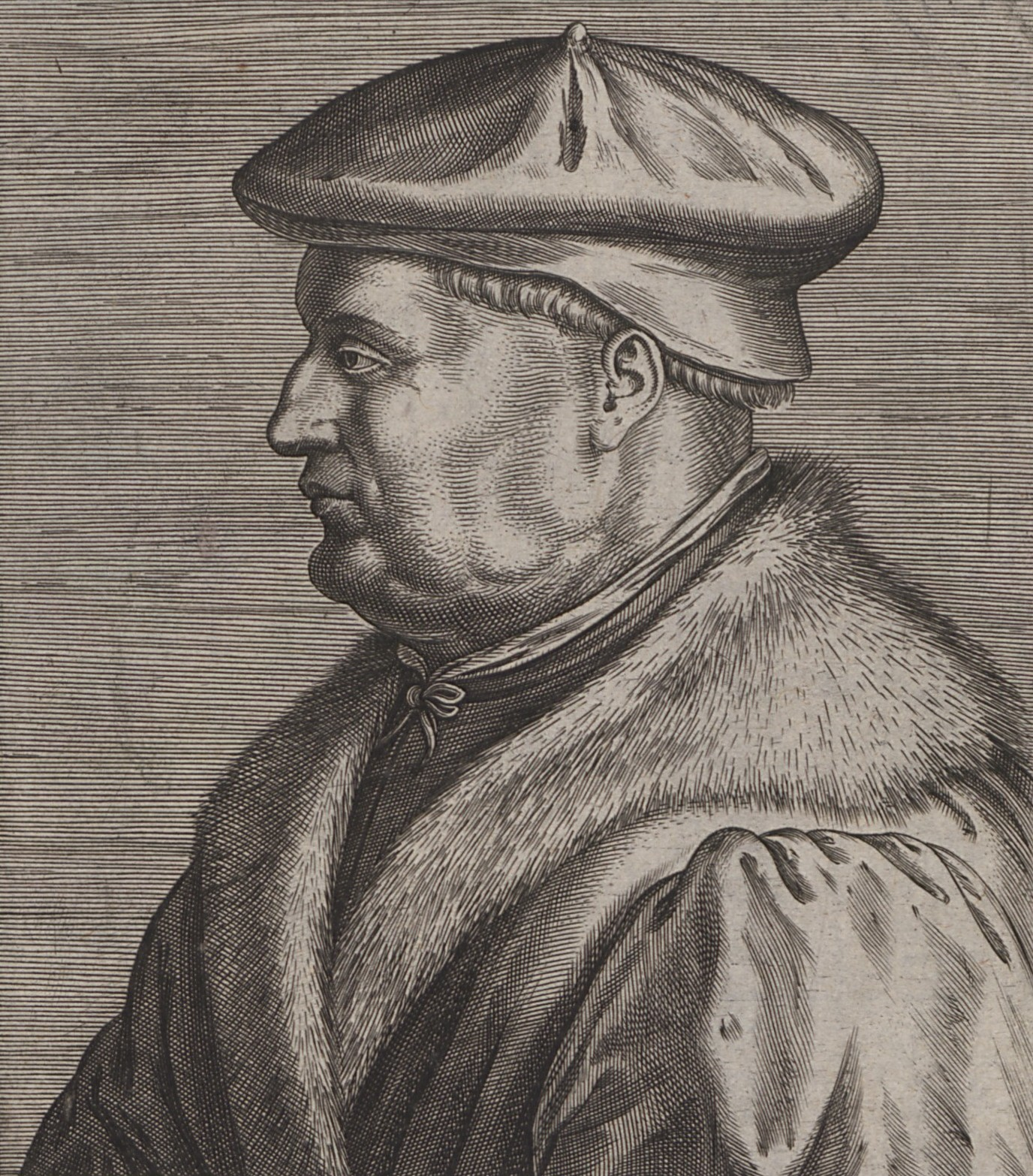
Johannes Dantiscus

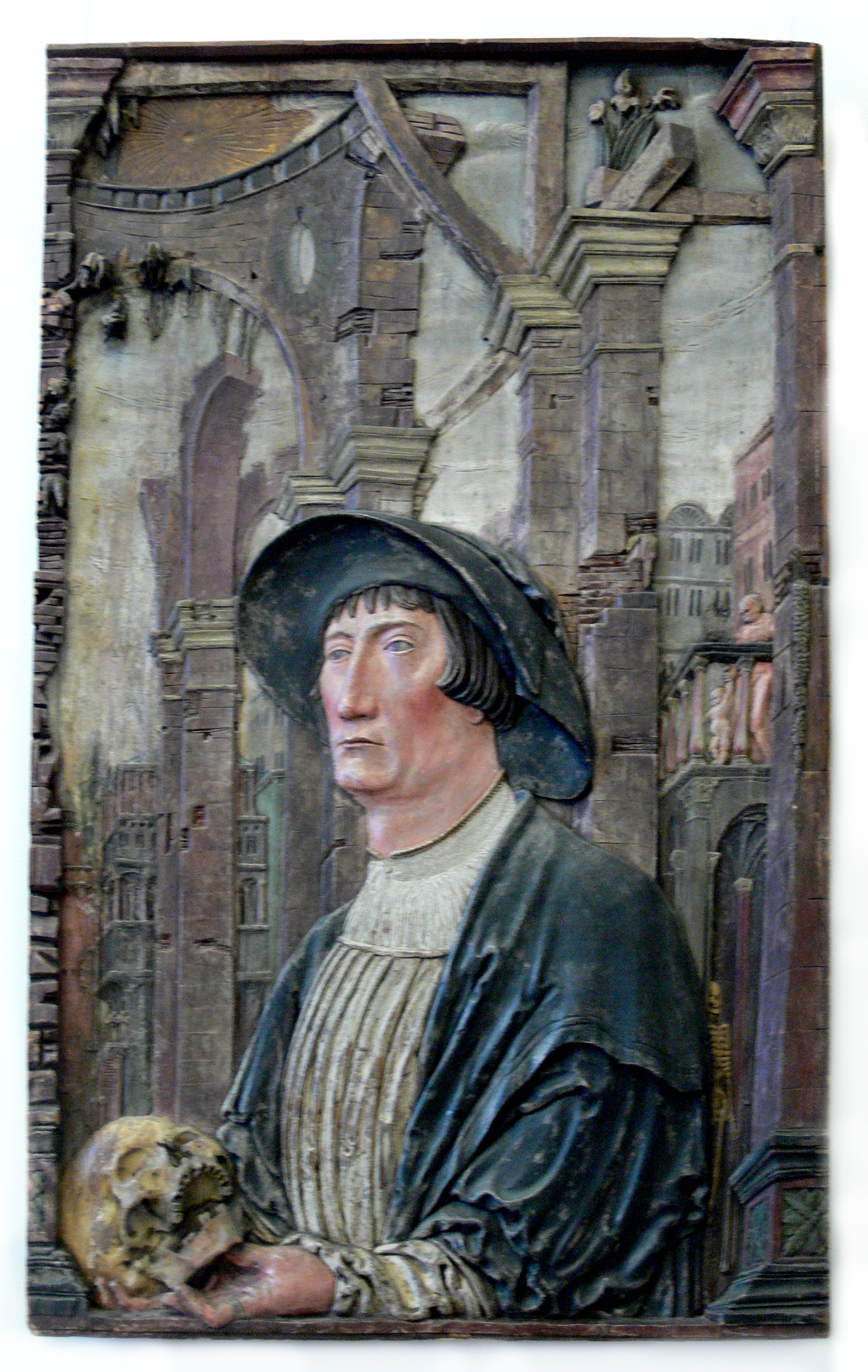
Tiedemann Giese

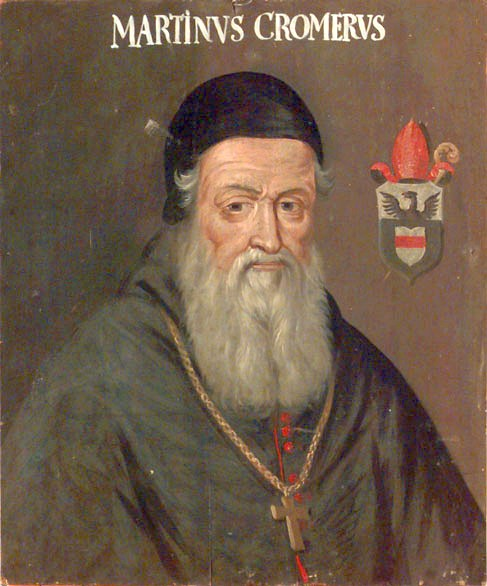
Martin Kromer

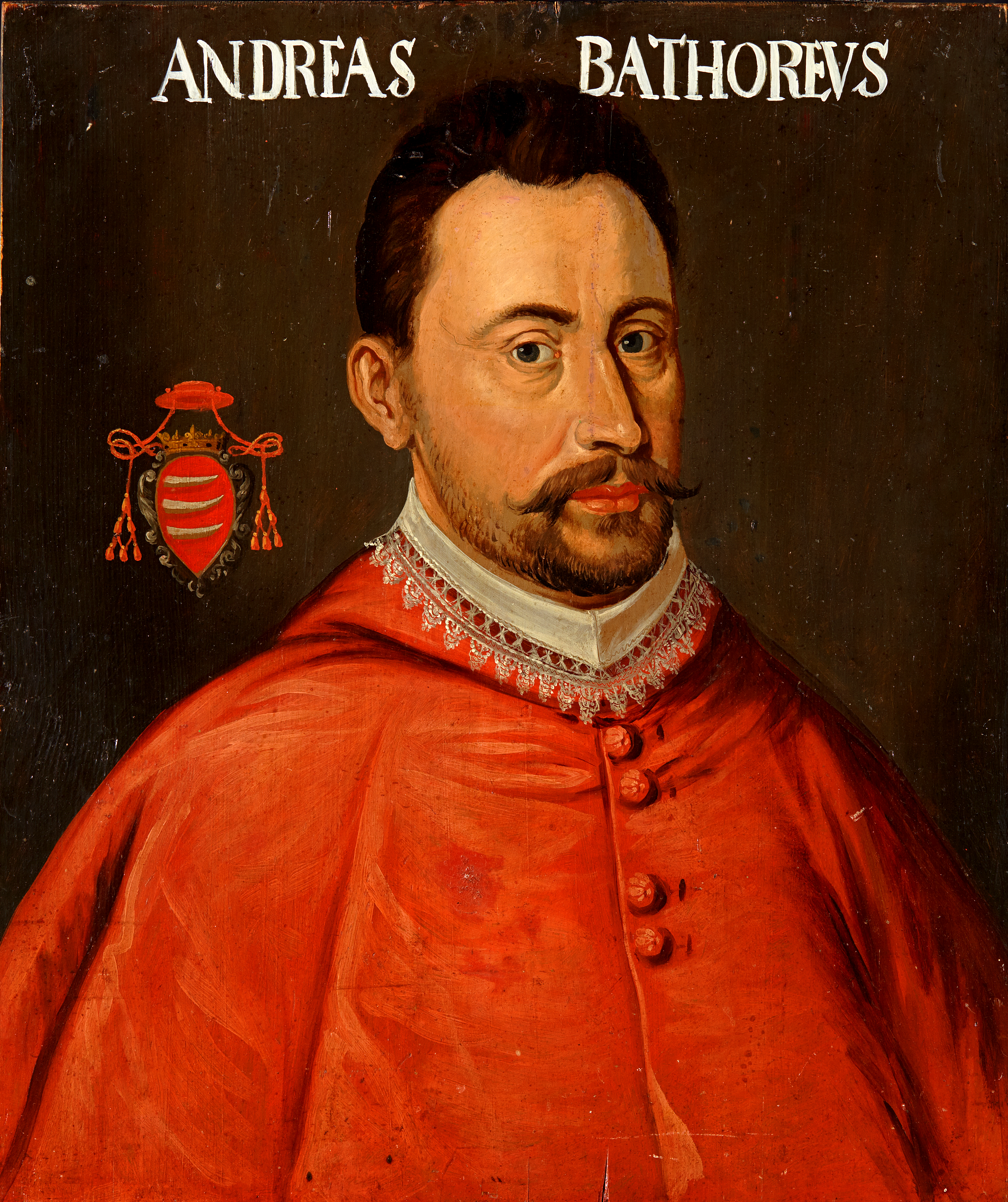
Andrew Báthory

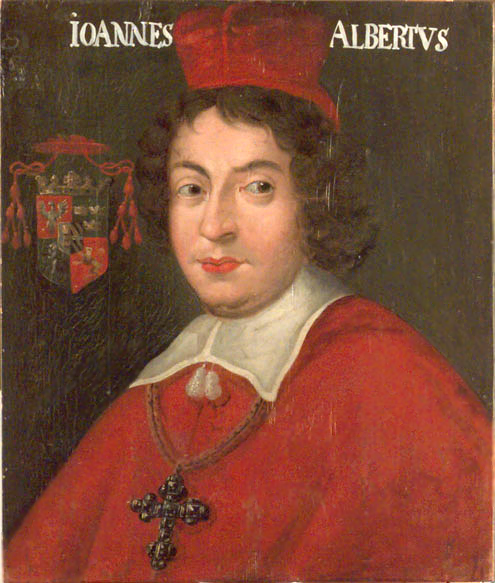
John Albert Vasa

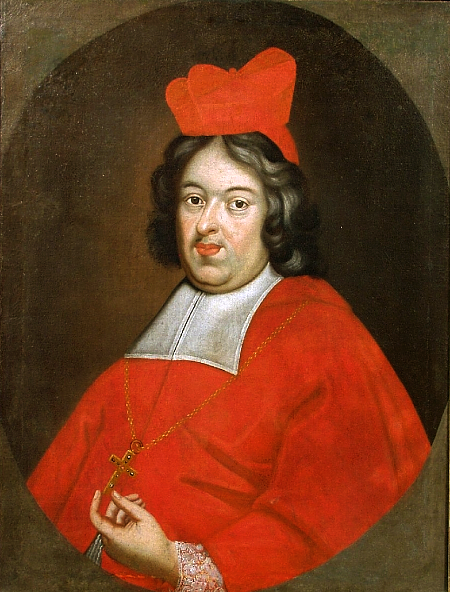
Michał Stefan Radziejowski

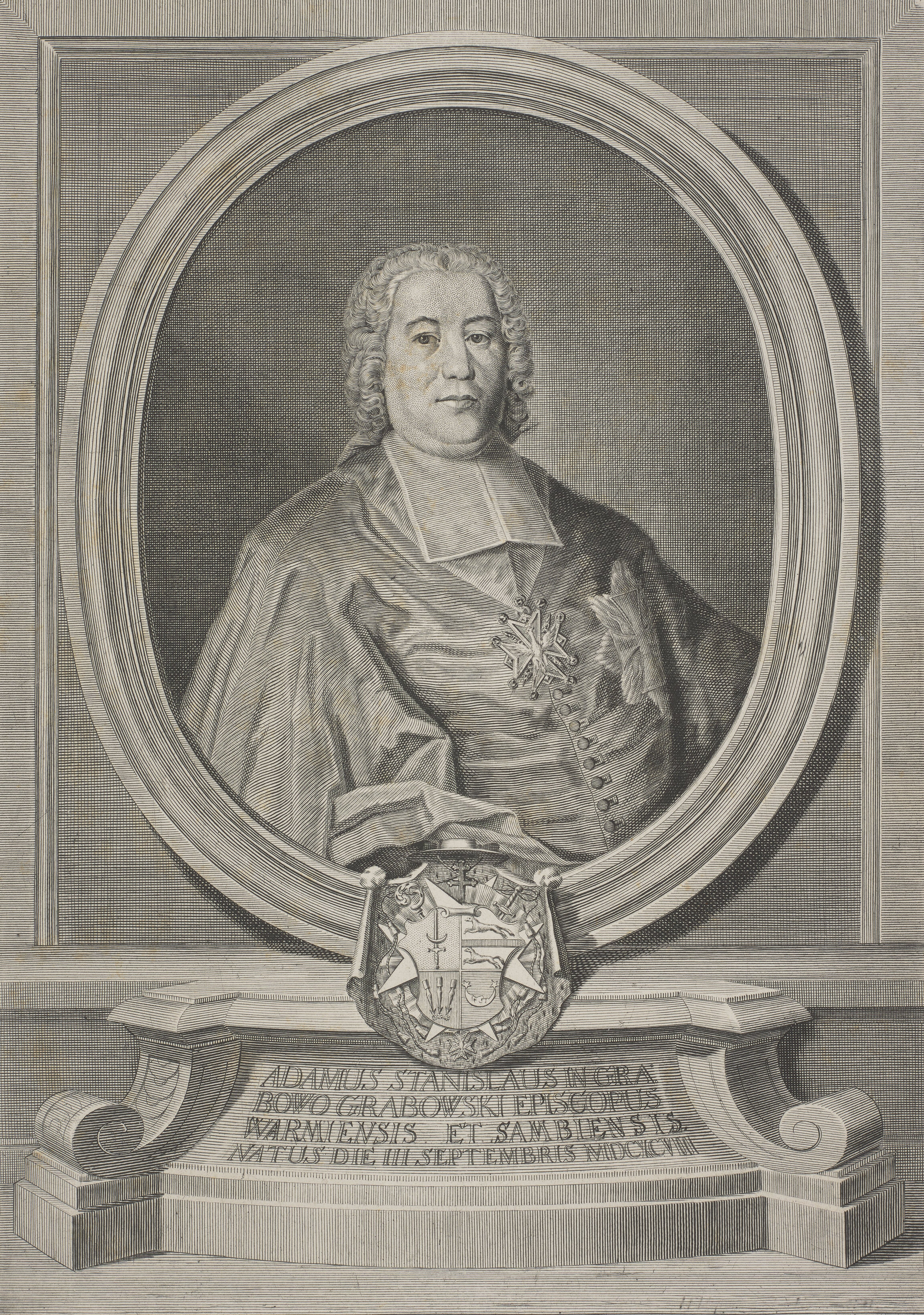
Adam Stanisław Grabowski

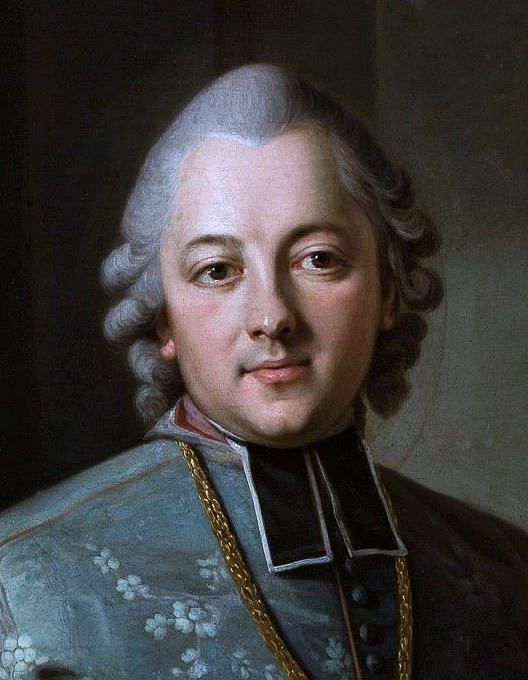
Ignacy Krasicki

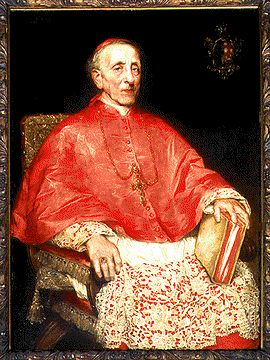
Philipp Krementz

This is a list of Bishops and Prince-Bishops of the Diocese of Warmia (Polish: Diecezja warmińska, Latin: Dioecesis Varmiensis, German: Bistum Ermland), which was elevated to the Archdiocese of Warmia in 1992.

The Bishopric was founded in 1243 as the Bishopric of Ermland, one of four bishoprics of Teutonic Prussia. In 1356 it became an Imperial Prince-Bishopric under Emperor Charles IV, and from 1512 until 1930 it was an exempt diocese. From 1947 to 1972 the episcopal see was left vacant following the expulsion of the German population and the Bishop of Ermland from Prussia. The cathedral capitular canons elected capitular vicars for the time sede vacante, recognised by the Holy See.

In 1972 the Holy See installed a new Polish diocese, which in 1992 was elevated to an archdiocese.

== Bishops of Ermland / Warmia ==
- 1249–1250 Heinrich von Strateich, elected, never actually took office
- 1250–1274 Anselm of Meissen, first actual bishop to be active in Ermland, from 1253 suffragan of the Archdiocese of Riga
- 1278–1300 Heinrich Fleming (Henryk Fleming)
- 1301–1326 Eberhard von Neiße (Nysa, Poland) (Neiße)
- 1327–1328 Jordan, Bishop of Warmia
- 1329–1334 Heinrich Wogenap (Wogenap)
- 1334–1337 sede vacante
- 1337–1349 Hermann von Prag (Herman z Pragi) (Prague)
- 1350–1355 Johannes of Meissen

== Prince-Bishops of Ermland / Warmia ==
- 1355–1373 Johannes Stryprock (Stryprock), designated Prince-Bishop by the Golden Bull
- 1373–1401 Heinrich Sorbom (Sorbom)
- 1401–1415 Heinrich Heilsberg von Vogelsang (Vogelsang)
- 1415–1424 Johannes Abezier
- 1424–1457 Franz Kuhschmalz (Franciszek Kuhschmalz)
- 1457–1458 Enea Silvio Piccolomini
- 1458–1467 Paul von Legendorf (Legendorf)
- 1467–1489 Nicolaus von Tüngen (Mikołaj Tungen)
- 1489–1512 Lucas Watzenrode
- 1512–1523 Fabian of Lossainen, from 1512 de facto exempt, integration into the Archdiocese of Gniezno having failed
- 1523–1537 Mauritius Ferber
- 1537–1548 Johannes Dantiscus (Jan Dantyszek, also known as The Father of Polish Diplomacy)
- 1549–1550 Tiedemann Giese
- 1551–1579 Stanislaus Hosius, from 1566 de jure exempt with Riga dissolved
- 1579–1589 Martin Kromer
- 1589–1599 Andrew Báthory
- 1600–1604 Piotr Tylicki
- 1604–1621 Szymon Rudnicki
- 1621–1633 John Albert Vasa
- 1633–1643 Mikołaj Szyszkowski
- 1643–1644 Jan Karol Konopacki
- 1644–1659 Wacław Leszczyński
- 1659–1679 Jan Stefan Wydżga
- 1680–1688 Michał Stefan Radziejowski
- 1688–1697 Jan Stanisław Zbąski
- 1698–1711 Andrzej Chryzostom Załuski
- 1711–1723 Teodor Andrzej Potocki
- 1724–1740 Christopher Johan Szembek (1680–1740)
- 1741–1766 Adam Stanisław Grabowski (1698–1766)
- 1767–1795 Ignacy Krasicki
- 1795–1803 Karl von Hohenzollern-Hechingen
- 1803–1808 sede vacante
- 1808–1836 Joseph von Hohenzollern-Hechingen

== Bishops ==
- 1836–1841 Andreas Stanislaus von Hatten
- 1841–1867 Joseph Ambrosius Geritz
- 1867–1885 Philipp Krementz
- 1886–1908 Andreas Thiel
- 1908–1930 Augustinus Bludau
- 1930–1947 Maximilian Kaller, suffragan of Roman Catholic Archdiocese of Breslau/Wrocław since 1930. Kaller remained bishop until 1947, even though expelled from Warmia in 1946.
- 1947–1972 sede vacante
  - 1947–1957: Arthur Kather (1883–1957), as vicar capitular; also vicar general for the diocesan area under Soviet rule from 1945 to 1957
  - 1957–1972: Paul Hoppe (1900–1988), as vicar capitular
- 1972–1978 Józef Drzazga, suffragan of Archdiocese of Warsaw
- 1979–1981 Józef Glemp
- 1981–1988 Jan Władysław Obłąk
- 1988–1992 Edmund Michał Piszcz, elevated as archbishop in 1992

== Archbishops ==
- 1992–2006 Edmund Michał Piszcz, bishop from 1988
- 2006–2016 Wojciech Ziemba
- since 2016 Józef Górzyński

== See also ==
- Roman Catholic Archdiocese of Warmia
- Prince-Bishopric of Warmia
