= Ignacy Krasicki =

Poland's leading Enlightenment poet (1735–1801)

His Excellency Ignacy Krasicki
- Archbishop of Gniezno; Primate of Poland
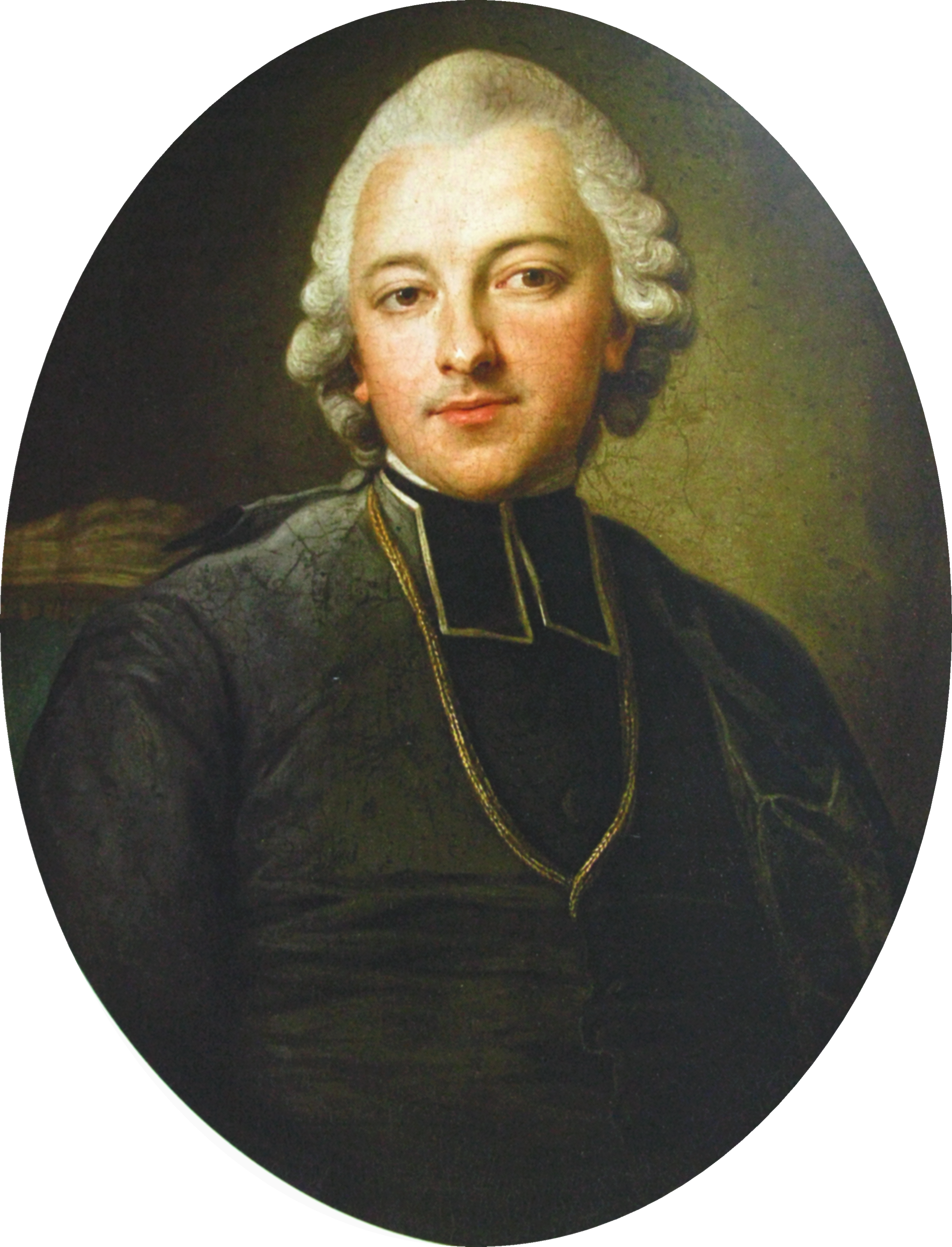
- Archdiocese: Gniezno
- In office: 1796–1801
- Predecessor: Michał Jerzy Poniatowski
- Successor: Ignacy Raczyński

Personal details
- Born: 3 February 1735 Dubiecko, Sanok Land
- Died: 14 March 1801 (aged 66), Berlin
- Denomination: Roman Catholicism
- Occupation: Writer, Primate of Poland
- Coat of arms

Ignacy Błażej Franciszek Krasicki (3 February 1735 – 14 March 1801), from 1766 Prince-Bishop of Warmia and from 1795 Archbishop of Gniezno (thus, Primate of Poland), was Poland's leading Enlightenment poet ("the Prince of Poets"), a critic of the clergy, Poland's La Fontaine, author of the first Polish novel, playwright, journalist, encyclopedist, and translator from French and Greek.

His most notable literary works were his Fables and Parables (1779), Satires (1779), and poetic letters and religious lyrics, in which the artistry of his poetic language reached its summit.

== Life ==
Ignacy Krasicki was born in Dubiecko, on southern Poland's San River, into the noble Krasicki family, which bore the title of Imperial Count. His parents were Count Jan Boży Krasicki (1704–1751) and the Count's wife, Anna Starzechowska (1706–1766) of the Nieczuja coat of arms. Ignacy was related by blood to the most illustrious families in the Polish–Lithuanian Commonwealth, including the Sapieha, Potocki, and Rzewuski families, and spent his childhood surrounded with the love and solicitude of his own family.

He attended a Jesuit school in Lwów, then studied at a Warsaw Catholic seminary (1751–54). In 1759 he took holy orders and continued his education in Rome (1759–61). Two of his brothers also entered the priesthood.

Returning to Poland, Krasicki became secretary to the Primate of Poland and developed a friendship with future King Stanisław August Poniatowski. When Poniatowski was elected king (1764), Krasicki became his chaplain. He participated in the King's famous "Thursday dinners" and cofounded the Monitor, the preeminent Polish Enlightenment periodical, sponsored by the King.

In 1766 Krasicki, after having served that year as coadjutor to Prince-Bishop of Warmia Adam Stanisław Grabowski, was himself elevated to Prince-Bishop of Warmia and ex officio membership in the Senate of the Commonwealth. This office gave him a high standing in the social hierarchy and a sense of independence. It did not, however, prove a quiet haven. The Warmia cathedral chapter welcomed its superior coolly, fearing changes. At the same time, there were growing provocations and pressures from Prussia, preparatory to seizure of Warmia in the First Partition of the Polish–Lithuanian Commonwealth. Krasicki protested publicly against external intervention.

In 1772, as a result of the First Partition, instigated by Prussia's King Frederick II ("the Great"), Krasicki became a Prussian subject. He did not, however, pay homage to Warmia's new master.

He now made frequent visits to Berlin, Potsdam and Sanssouci at the bidding of Frederick, with whom he cultivated an acquaintance. This created a difficult situation for the poet-bishop who, while a friend of the Polish king, maintained close relations with the Prussian king. These realities could not but influence the nature and direction of Krasicki's subsequent literary productions, perhaps nowhere more so than in the Fables and Parables (1779).

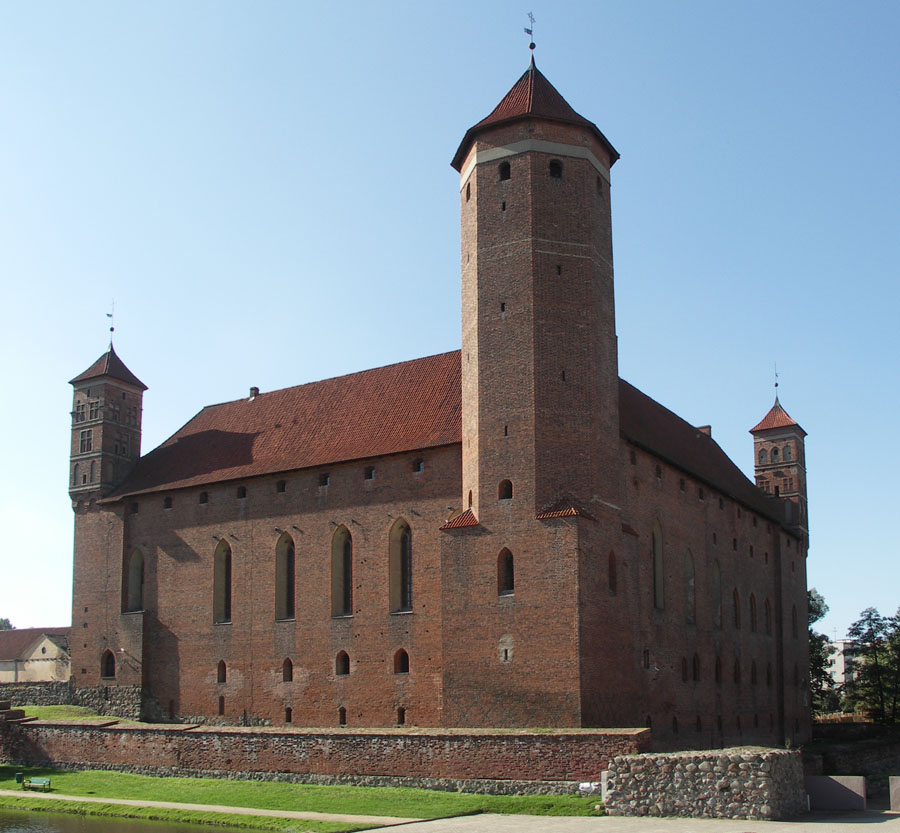
Castle of the bishops of Warmia at Lidzbark Warmiński

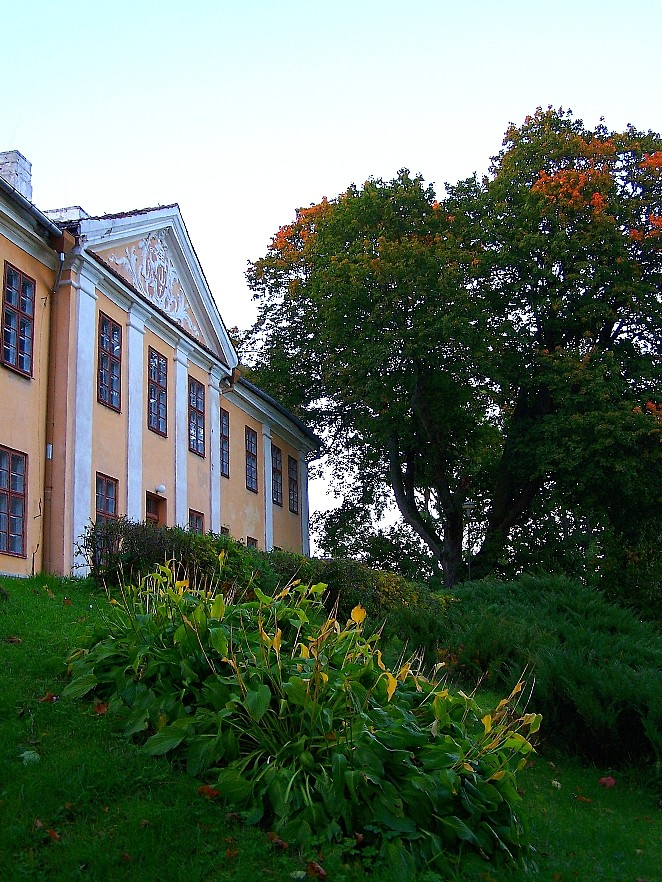
Summer palace of the bishops of Warmia at Smolajny

Soon after the First Partition, Krasicki officiated at the 1773 opening of Berlin's St. Hedwig's Cathedral, which Frederick had built for Catholic immigrants to Brandenburg and Berlin. In 1786 Krasicki was called to the Prussian Academy of Sciences. His residences in the castle of the bishops of Warmia at Lidzbark Warmiński (in German, Heilsberg) and in the summer palace of the bishops of Warmia at Smolajny became centers of artistic patronage for all sectors of partitioned Poland.

After Frederick the Great's death, Krasicki continued relations with Frederick's successor.

In 1795, six years before his death, Krasicki was elevated to Archbishop of Gniezno (thus, to Primate of Poland).

Krasicki was honored by Poland's King Stanisław August Poniatowski with the Order of the White Eagle and the Order of Saint Stanisław, as well as with a special 1780 medal featuring the Latin device, "Dignum laude virum Musa vetat mori" ("The Muse will not let perish a man deserving of glory"); and by Prussia's King Frederick the Great, with the Order of the Red Eagle.

Upon his death in Berlin in 1801, Krasicki was laid to rest at St. Hedwig's Cathedral, which he had consecrated. In 1829 his remains were transferred to Poland's Gniezno Cathedral.

Czesław Miłosz describes Krasicki:

He was a man of the golden mean, a smiling, skeptical sage [who] prais[ed] moderation and despis[ed] extremes. His was a mentality which returned to Horatian ideals of the Renaissance, to a life of contemplative retirement. This did not interfere with his talents as a courtier: he was a favorite of [Poland's King] Stanisław August [Poniatowski], and after the [F]irst [P]artition [of Poland, in 1772], when his bishopric of Warmia became the property of Prussia, he was a favorite of King Frederick the Great. [H]e was a cosmopolit[e] and owed his imposing literary knowledge to his readings in foreign languages, yet... he was indebted to the mentality of the Polish "Golden Age," and in this respect his admiration for Erasmus of Rotterdam is significant. As a poet, he was [chiefly responsible] for that distillation of the [Polish] language which for a while toned down the chaotic richness of the Baroque. In a way, he returned to the clear and simple language of [Jan] Kochanowski, and his role in Polish poetry may be compared to that of Alexander Pope in English poetry. [H]e conceived of literature as a specific vocation, namely, to intervene as a moralist in human affairs. Since he was not pugnacious by temperament (contrary to one of his masters, Voltaire), his moralizing, rarely distinguishable from sheer play, [does not show] vitriolic accents.

== Works ==
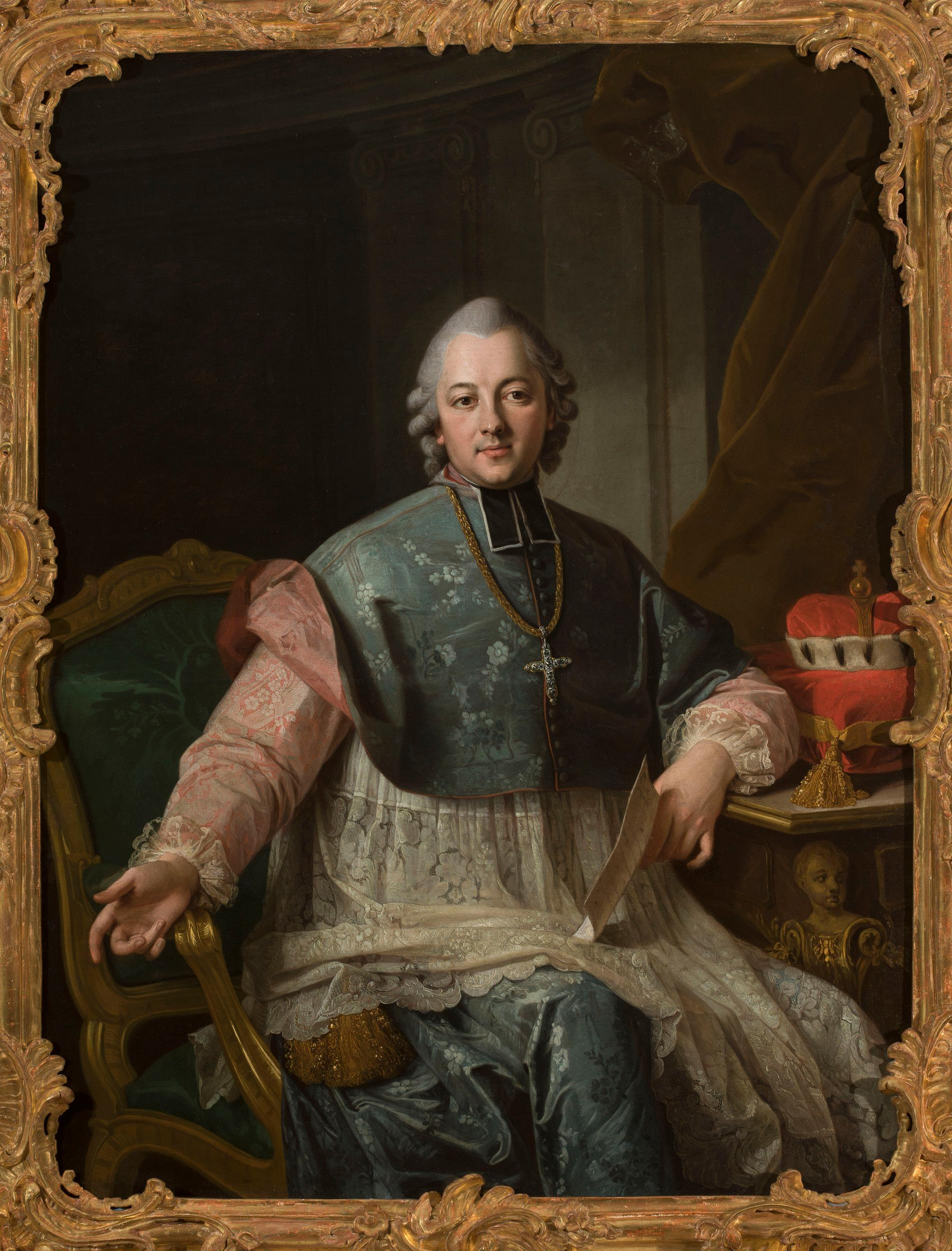
Portrait of Krasicki by Per Krafft the Elder, c. 1767

Ignacy Krasicki was the leading literary representative of the Polish Enlightenment—a prose writer and poet highly esteemed by his contemporaries, who admired his works for their wit, imagination, and fluid style.

Krasicki's literary writings lent splendor to the reign of Poland's King Stanisław August Poniatowski, while not directly advocating the King's political program.

Krasicki, the leading representative of Polish classicism, debuted as a poet with the strophe-hymn, "Święta miłości kochanej ojczyzny" ("O Sacred Love of the Beloved Country"), published in 1774. He was then nearing forty. It was thus a late debut that brought the extraordinary success of this strophe, which Krasicki would incorporate as part of song IX in his mock-heroic poem, Myszeida (Mouseiad, 1775). In "O Sacred Love of the Beloved Country," Krasicki formulated a universal idea of patriotism, expressed in high style and elevated tone. The strophe would later, for many years, serve as a national anthem and see many translations, including three into French.

The Prince Bishop of Warmia gave excellent Polish form to all the genres of European classicism. He also blazed paths for new genres. Prominent among these was the first modern Polish novel, Mikołaja Doświadczyńskiego przypadki (The Adventures of Nicholas Experience, 1776), a synthesis of all the varieties of the Enlightenment novel: the social-satirical, the adventure (à la Robinson Crusoe), the Utopian, and the didactic.

Tradition has it that Krasicki's mock-heroic poem, Monachomachia (War of the Monks, 1778), was inspired by a conversation with Frederick II at the palace of Sanssouci, where Krasicki was staying in an apartment that had once been used by Voltaire. At the time, the poem's publication caused a public scandal.

The most enduring literary monument of the Polish Enlightenment is Krasicki's fables: Bajki i Przypowieści (Fables and Parables, 1779) and Bajki nowe (New Fables, published posthumously in 1802). The poet also set down his trenchant observations of the world and human nature in Satyry (Satires, 1779).

Other works by Krasicki include the novels, Pan Podstoli (Lord High Steward, published in three parts, 1778, 1784 and posthumously 1803), which would help inspire works by Mickiewicz, and Historia (History, 1779); the epic, Wojna chocimska (The Chocim War, 1780, about the Khotyn War); and numerous others, in homiletics, theology and heraldry.

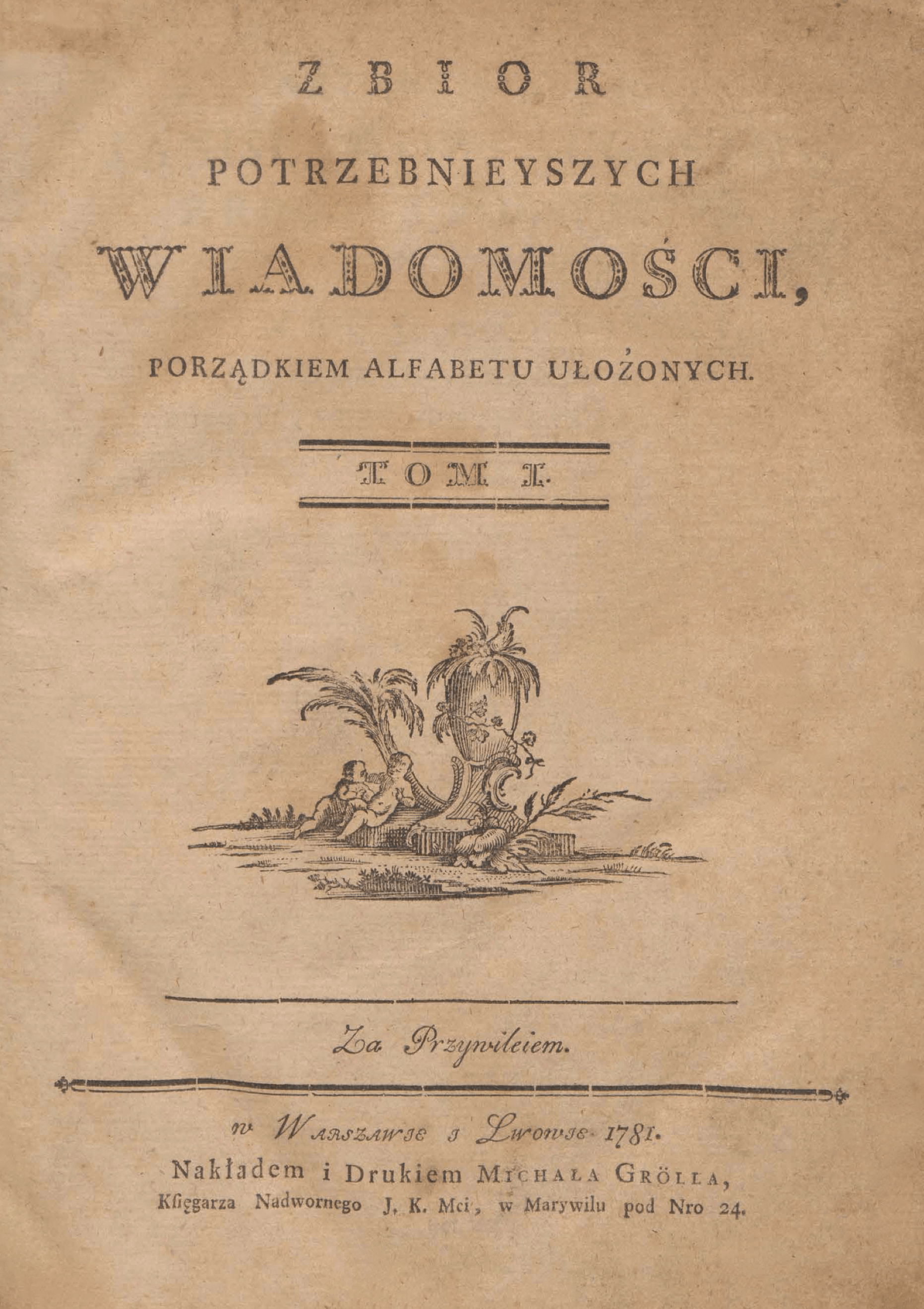
A Collection of Essential Information, vol. I, 1781

In 1781–83 Krasicki published a two-volume encyclopedia, Zbiór potrzebniejszych wiadomości (A Collection of Essential Information), the second Polish-language general encyclopedia after Benedykt Chmielowski's Nowe Ateny (The New Athens, 1745–46).

Krasicki wrote Listy o ogrodach (Letters about Gardens) and articles in the Monitor, which he had co-founded, and in his own newspaper, Co Tydzień (Each Week).

Krasicki translated, into Polish, Plutarch, Ossian, fragments of Dante's Divine Comedy, and works by Anacreon, Boileau, Hesiod and Theocritus. He wrote a 1772 essay "On the Translation of Books" ("O przekładaniu ksiąg") and another, published posthumously in 1803, "On Translating Books" ("O tłumaczeniu ksiąg").

== Fame ==
Krasicki's major works won European fame and were translated into Latin, French, German, Italian, Russian, Czech, Croatian, Slovene, and Hungarian. The broad reception of his works was sustained throughout the 19th century.

Krasicki has been the subject of works by poets of the Polish Enlightenment – Stanisław Trembecki, Franciszek Zabłocki, Wojciech Mier – and in the 20th century, by Konstanty Ildefons Gałczyński. He has been the hero of prose works by Wincenty Pol, Adolf Nowaczyński and Henryk Sienkiewicz.

== Literary reflection ==
Scholars have viewed Krasicki's Fables and Satires as adaptive to the culture for which they were written, and as politically charged. The characterizations were not based on reconstructions of individuals from direct observation, but were fictional constructs that reflected society's actual values. Krasicki held that Poles, and humanity generally, were governed by greed, folly, and vice.

== Target audience ==
Evidence for this is found in the preface, "To the Children", targeted not to children but to villagers, congregations, and the commonalty. The fables were meant to bring attention to major questions of the day, and to advocate for social reforms. Although the New Fables, the sequel to the Fables and Parables, were published posthumously in 1803, the better known Fables and Parables found their audience between 1735 and Krasicki's death in 1801, most of them being published after the First Partition of Poland, of 1772. The fables usually find their meaning in the final line, through the symbology of the tale rather than through a complex presentation of ideology, thereby readily conveying even to the illiterate the moral and the Enlightenment ideal behind it.

== Enlightenment contributions ==
Katarzyna Zechenter argues in The Polish Review that Western historians have generally overlooked Krasicki's works, and that the publisher of Polish Fables (1997) overlooked the importance of the "political and social context contributing to [the fable's] origin." However, it is easy to see Krasicki's influence on his contemporaries and on the early 19th century, as in the case of Gabriela Puzynina, a Polish princess, poet, and diarist. In 1846 she started a newspaper for the intelligentsia of Vilnius and Warsaw, and furthered the establishment of Krasicki's Fables in Poland's suppressed political life. In her Diary of the Years 1815–1843, Puzynina focuses on the fable, "Birds in a Cage", as a commentary on the Partitions of Poland.

== See also ==
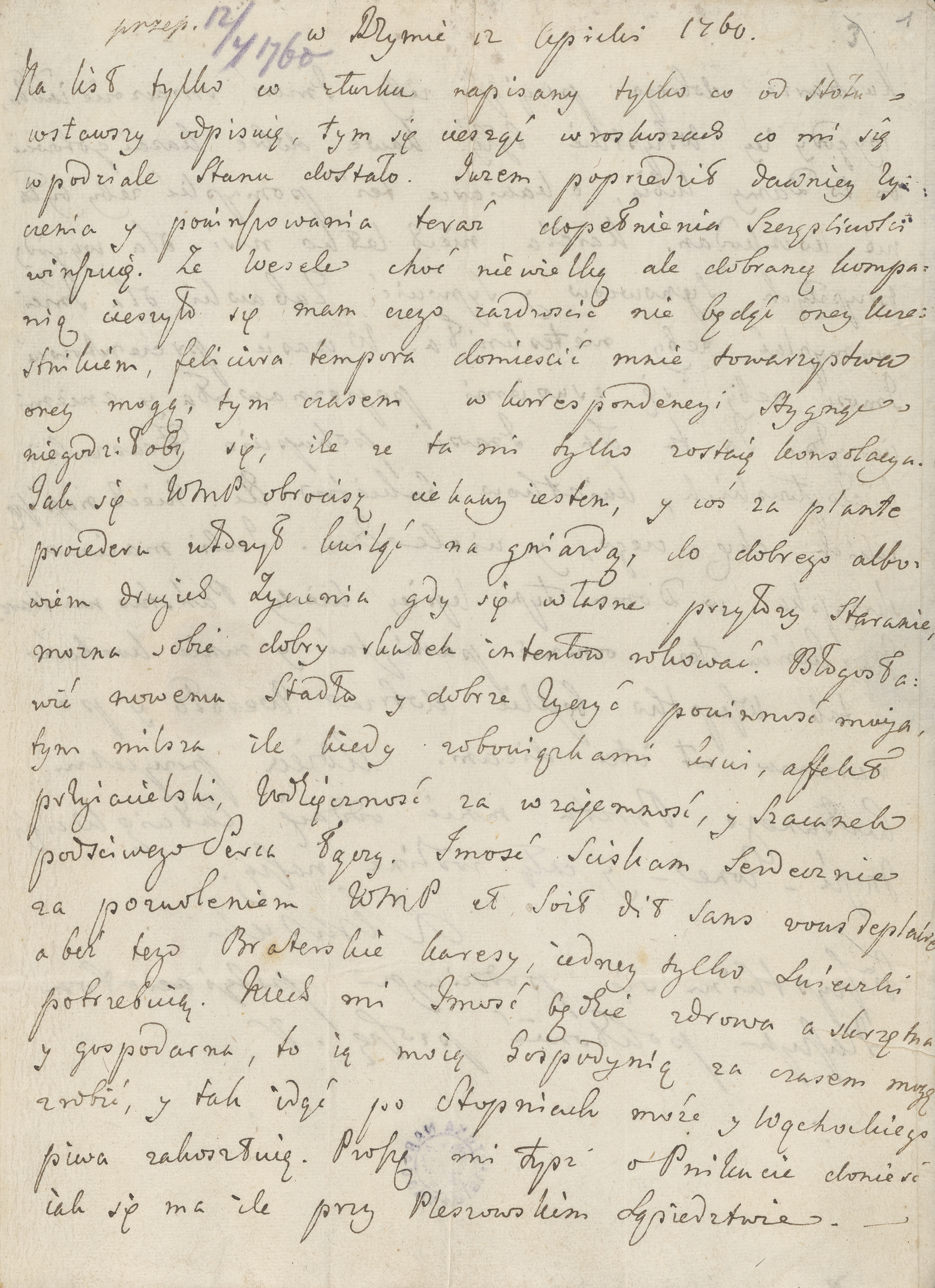
Letter by Ignacy Krasicki

- The Adventures of Mr. Nicholas Wisdom
- Fable
- Fables and Parables
- List of Poles
- Monitor (Polish newspaper)
- "O Sacred Love of the Beloved Country"
- Poles
- Polish literature
- Political fiction
- Translation

== Sources ==
- Edward Balcerzan, ed., Pisarze polscy o sztuce przekładu, 1440–1974: Antologia (Polish Writers on the Art of Translation, 1440–1974: an Anthology), Poznań, Wydawnictwo Poznańskie, 1977.
- Jan Zygmunt Jakubowski, ed., Literatura polska od śreniowiecza do pozytywizmu (Polish Literature from the Middle Ages to Positivism), Warsaw, Państwowe Wydawnictwo Naukowe, 1979, ISBN 83-01-00201-8, pp. 245–54.
- Encyklopedia Polski (Encyclopedia of Poland), Kraków, Wydawnictwo Ryszard Kluszczyński, 1996, ISBN 83-86328-60-6.
- Julian Krzyżanowski, Historia literatury polskiej: Alegoryzm – preromantyzm (A History of Polish Literature: Allegorism – Preromanticism), Warsaw, Państwowy Instytut Wydawniczy, 1974, pp. 435–54.
- Zbigniew Landowski, Krystyna Woś, Słownik cytatów łacińskich: wyrażenia, sentencje, przysłowia (A Dictionary of Latin Citations: Expressions, Maxims, Proverbs), Kraków, Wydawnictwo Literackie, 2002, ISBN 83-08-02866-7.
- Czesław Miłosz, The History of Polish Literature, 2nd ed., Berkeley, University of California Press, 1983, ISBN 0-520-04477-0, pp. 176–81.

Regnal titles
Preceded by Adam Stanisław Grabowski	Prince-Bishop of Warmia (Ermland); 1767–1795	Succeeded by Karl von Hohenzollern-Hechingen
Catholic Church titles
Preceded by Michał Poniatowski	Primate of Poland; Archbishop of Gniezno; 1795–1801	Succeeded by Ignacy Raczyński
