= Monitor (Polish newspaper) =

1765–1785 Polish weekly newspaper

- Type: Semi-weekly newspaper
- Format: 9/14 cm
- Founder(s): Ignacy Krasicki, Adam Kazimierz Czartoryski
- Publisher: Lorenz Christoph Mizler
- Editor: e.g. Feliks Franciszek Łoyko, Tadeusz Lipski, Stanisław Konarski, Franciszek Bohomolec
- Founded: March 21, 1765; 261 years ago
- Ceased publication: 1785
- Political alignment: Faction of King Stanisław Poniatowski
- Language: Polish
- Headquarters: Warsaw
- Country: Polish-Lithuanian Commonwealth

The Monitor was one of the first newspapers in Poland, published from 1765 to 1785, during the Polish Enlightenment.

== History ==
The newspaper was created by Ignacy Krasicki and Adam Kazimierz Czartoryski, with initiative and supporting of king Stanisław August Poniatowski. It was published in royal printery, twice a week. Monitor usually had 8 pages.

It was edited in imitation of English The Spectator, some of articles from its were borrowed. Periodical supported and promoted religious tolerance, development of natural science and criticized noble and magnate feudalism but supported bourgeoisie and peasantry. In new, short journalist forms (essays, reportages, letters to staff, articles, opinion pieces etc.) autors [sic?] criticized sarmatic backwardness and propounded new model of enlightened nobleman. The main objective of this periodical was reform of customs and morality of society. There're fought off e.g.:

- Drunkenness and card playing
- Idleness
- Aversion to civilizational oeuvre of foreign countries
- Gossiping
- Mania of dueling
- Eulogism
- Fanaticism

The periodical was addressed to company of educated readers, became in first period of its existing the press organ of king's faction.

In Monitor there were printed texts of the most notable polish writers from 18th century, but in some years, mostly in later, there were dominated translations and adaptations of foreign autors' [sic?] texts, or its own articles from earlier years. E.g., all the year 1772 was written by Ignacy Krasicki, who translated and adapted to polish conditions articles from English "The Spectator".

The cooperators and editors of this periodical were mainly people from Stanisław August's surroundings, e.g. Feliks Franciszek Łoyko, Tadeusz Lipski, Stanisław Konarski and Franciszek Bohomolec

== See also ==
- Fables and Parables
- Gazeta Narodowa i Obca
- Gazeta Warszawska
- Merkuriusz Polski Ordynaryjny
- Zabawy Przyjemne i Pożyteczne (Pastimes Pleasant and Profitable)

== Bibliography ==
- Klimowicz M. - Enlightened, 2nd edition, Warsaw: PWN, 1975

== External lincs ==
- Digital copies of Lower Silesian Digital Library
- Digital copies of Digital Library of University of Łódź
