= Fables and Parables =

1779 work by Ignacy Krasicki

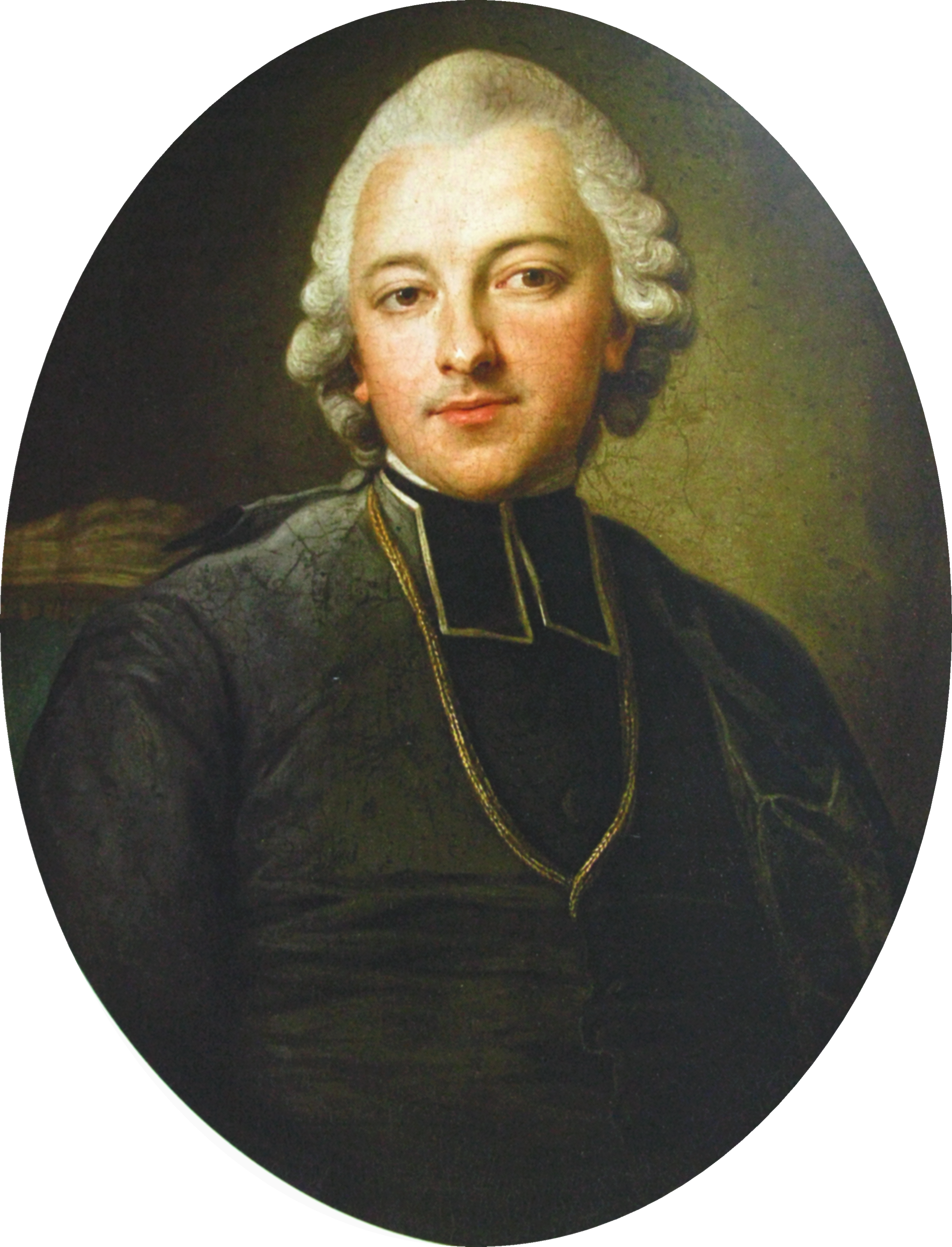
Ignacy Krasicki

Fables and Parables (Bajki i przypowieści, 1779), by Ignacy Krasicki (1735–1801), is a work in a long international tradition of fable-writing that reaches back to antiquity.

Krasicki's fables and parables have been described as being, "[l]ike Jean de La Fontaine's [fables],... amongst the best ever written, while in colour they are distinctly original, because Polish."

They are, according to Czesław Miłosz, "the most durable among Krasicki's poems."

== Characteristics ==
Emulating the fables of the ancient Greek Aesop, the Macedonian-Roman Phaedrus, the Polish Biernat of Lublin, and the Frenchman Jean de La Fontaine, and anticipating Russia's Ivan Krylov, Poland's Krasicki populates his fables with anthropomorphized animals, plants, inanimate objects, and forces of nature, in epigrammatic expressions of a skeptical, ironic view of the world.

That view is informed by Krasicki's observations of human nature and of national and international politics in his day—including the predicament of the expiring Polish–Lithuanian Commonwealth. Just seven years earlier (1772), the Commonwealth had experienced the first of three partitions that would, by 1795, totally expunge the Commonwealth from the political map of Europe.

The Polish–Lithuanian Commonwealth would fall victim to the aggression of three powerful neighbors much as, in Krasicki's fable of "The Lamb and the Wolves," the lamb falls prey to the two wolves. The First Partition had rendered Krasicki—an intimate of Poland's last king, Stanisław August Poniatowski—involuntarily a subject of that Partition's instigator, Prussia's King Frederick II ("the Great"). Krasicki would, unlike Frederick, survive to witness the final dismemberment of the Commonwealth.

Krasicki's parables (e.g., "Abuzei and Tair," "The Blind Man and the Lame," "Son and Father," "The Farmer," "Child and Father," "The Master and His Dog," "The King and the Scribes," and "The Drunkard") do not, by definition, employ the anthropomorphization that characterizes the fables. Instead, his parables point elegant moral lessons drawn from more quotidian human life.

Krasicki's, writes Czesław Miłosz, "is a world where the strong win and the weak lose in a sort of immutable order... Reason is exalted as the human equivalent of animal strength: the [clever] survive, the stupid perish."

Miłosz writes:

Poetry for [Krasicki] was a more concise and elegant prose, and originality of subject had no importance. Thus [he] borrowed the subjects of his fables from the enormous body of fabular literature starting with Aesop and finishing with his own French contemporaries. He also borrowed from [the earlier French fabulist] La Fontaine, especially in... his New Fables... published [posthumously in 1802], but whatever he took was always completely transformed. His extreme conciseness is best seen if one counts the number of words in the original author's version and compares it to that of Krasicki's on the same subject. The pleasure... for the poet [as well as] for the reader... is probably due to the [compression] of a whole story, sometimes even a novella, into a few lines, and among Krasicki's best... fables [are those] which [comprise] only one quatrain where the author's pen moves in one rush toward the final pointe.

The Fables and Parables are written as 13-syllable lines, in couplets with the rhyme scheme AA BB. They range in length from 2 to 18 lines. The introductory invocation "To the Children", while employing the same rhyme scheme, uses lines of 11 syllables.

Curiously, the fables include two with the identical title, "The Stream and the River"; two with the identical title, "The Lion and the Beasts"; two with the identical title, "Nightingale and Goldfinch"; and two with the identical title, "The Wolf and the Sheep".

Critics generally prefer Krasicki's more concise Fables and Parables (1779), sampled here, over his later New Fables, published posthumously in 1802. This is consistent with Krasicki's own dictum in On Versification and Versifiers that "A fable should be brief, clear and, so far as possible, preserve the truth."

In the same treatise, Krasicki explains that a fable "is a story commonly ascribed to animals, that people who read it might take instruction from [the animals'] example or speech...; it originated in eastern lands where supreme governance reposed in the hands of autocrats. Thus, when it was feared to proclaim the truth openly, simulacra were employed in fables so that—if only in this way—the truth might be agreeable alike to the ruled and to the rulers."

== Samples ==
Below are 20 samples from Krasicki's Fables and Parables (1779), in English translation by Christopher Kasparek. An additional 42 items may be found at Wikisource. The total of 62 items constitute 52% of the 119 in Krasicki's Fables and Parables.

=== Preface to the Fables ===
There was once a young man whose temperance never flagged;
There was an old man, too, who never scolded or nagged;
There was a rich man who shared his wealth with the needy;
There flourished an author, for renown never greedy;
There was a customs man who did not steal; a cobbler who shunned alcohol;
A soldier who did not boast; a rogue who did not brawl;
There was a politician who never thought of self;
There was a poet who never put lies on his shelf.

"Why do you tell me that each of these is a fable?"

"I hate to gainsay you, but that's the proper label."

=== Abuzei and Tair ===
"Congratulate me, father," said Tair, "I prosper.
Tomorrow I am to become the Sultan's brother-
In-law and hunt with him." Quoth father: "All does alter,
Your lord's good graces, women's favor, autumn weather."
He had guessed aright, the son's plans did not turn out well:
The Sultan withheld his sister, all day the rain fell.

=== The Blind Man and the Lame ===
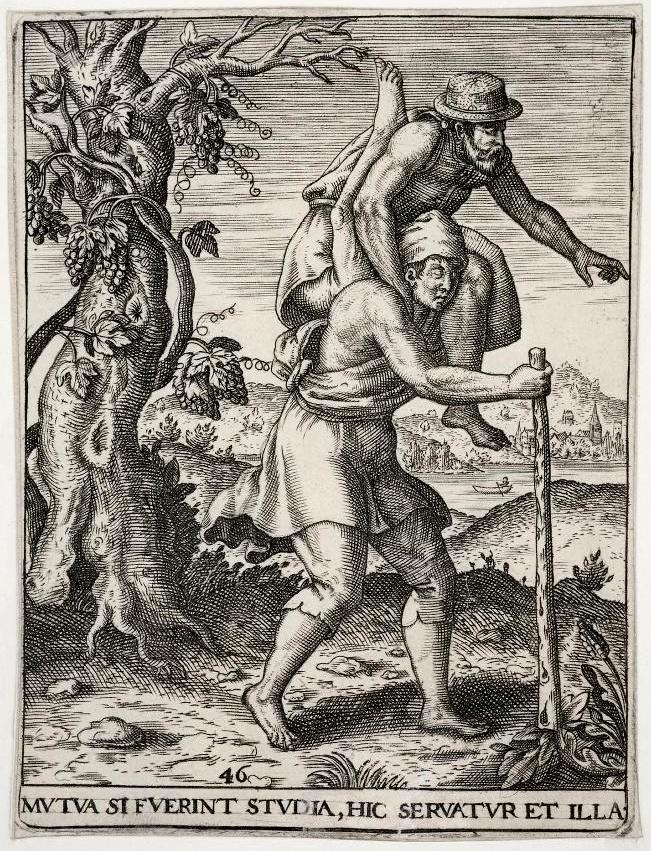
The Blind Man and the Lame", from de Bry's Emblemata saecularia, 1596

A blind man was carrying a lame man on his back,
And everything was going well, everything's on track,
When the blind man decides to take it into his head
That he needn't listen to all that the lame man said.
"This stick I have will guide the two of us safe," said he,
And though warned by the lame man, he plowed into a tree.
On they proceeded; the lame man now warned of a brook;
The two survived, but their possessions a soaking took.
At last the blind man ignored the warning of a drop,
And that was to turn out their final and fatal stop.

Which of the two travelers, you may ask, was to blame?

Why, 'twas both the heedless blind man and the trusting lame.

=== The Eagle and the Hawk ===
Eagle, not wishing to incommode himself with chase,
Decided to send hawk after sparrows in his place.
Hawk brought him the sparrows, eagle ate them with pleasure;
At last, not quite sated with the dainties to measure,
Feeling his appetite growing keener and keener —
Eagle ate fowl for breakfast, the fowler for dinner.

=== Son and Father ===
Every age has its bitter, every age has its grief:
Son toiled o'er his book, father was vexed beyond belief.
The one had no rest; the other no freedom, forsooth:
Father lamented his age, son lamented his youth.

=== Birds in a Cage ===
"Why do you weep?" inquired the young siskin of the old,
"You're more comfortable in this cage than out in the cold."
"You were born caged," said the elder, "this was your morrow;
"I was free, now I'm caged—hence the cause of my sorrow."

=== The Little Fish and the Pike ===
Espying a worm in the water, the little fish

Did greatly regret the worm could not become his dish.

Up came a pike and made his preparations to dine;

He swallowed both worm and hook, which he failed to divine.

As the angler pulled ashore his magnificent prize,

Quoth the little fish: "Sometimes good to be undersize."

=== The Farmer ===
A farmer, bent on doubling the profits from his land,
Proceeded to set his soil a two-harvest demand.
Too intent thus on profit, harm himself he must needs:
Instead of corn, he now reaps corn cockle and weeds.

=== Two Dogs ===
"Why do I freeze out of doors while you sleep on a rug?"
Inquired the bobtail mongrel of the fat, sleek pug.
"I have run of the house, and you the run of a chain,"
The pug replied, "because you serve, while I entertain."

=== Child and Father ===
The father switched his child for his refusal to learn;
After Dad left, the angry child set the switch to burn.
Soon Jack once more disobeyed and earned lashes again;
His father could not find the switch — so he used a cane.

=== The Master and His Dog ===
The dog barked all the night, keeping the burglar away;
It got a beating for waking the master, next day.
That night it slept soundly and did the burglar no harm;
He burgled; the dog got caned for not raising alarm.

=== The Humble Lion ===
'Tis bad at master's court to lie, bad the truth to tell.
Lion, intent on showing all that he was humble,
Called for open reproaches. Said the fox: "Your great vice
Is that you're too kind, too gracious, excessively nice."
The sheep, seeing lion pleased by fox's rebuke, said:
"You are a cruel, voracious tyrant." — and she was dead.

=== The Lamb and the Wolves ===
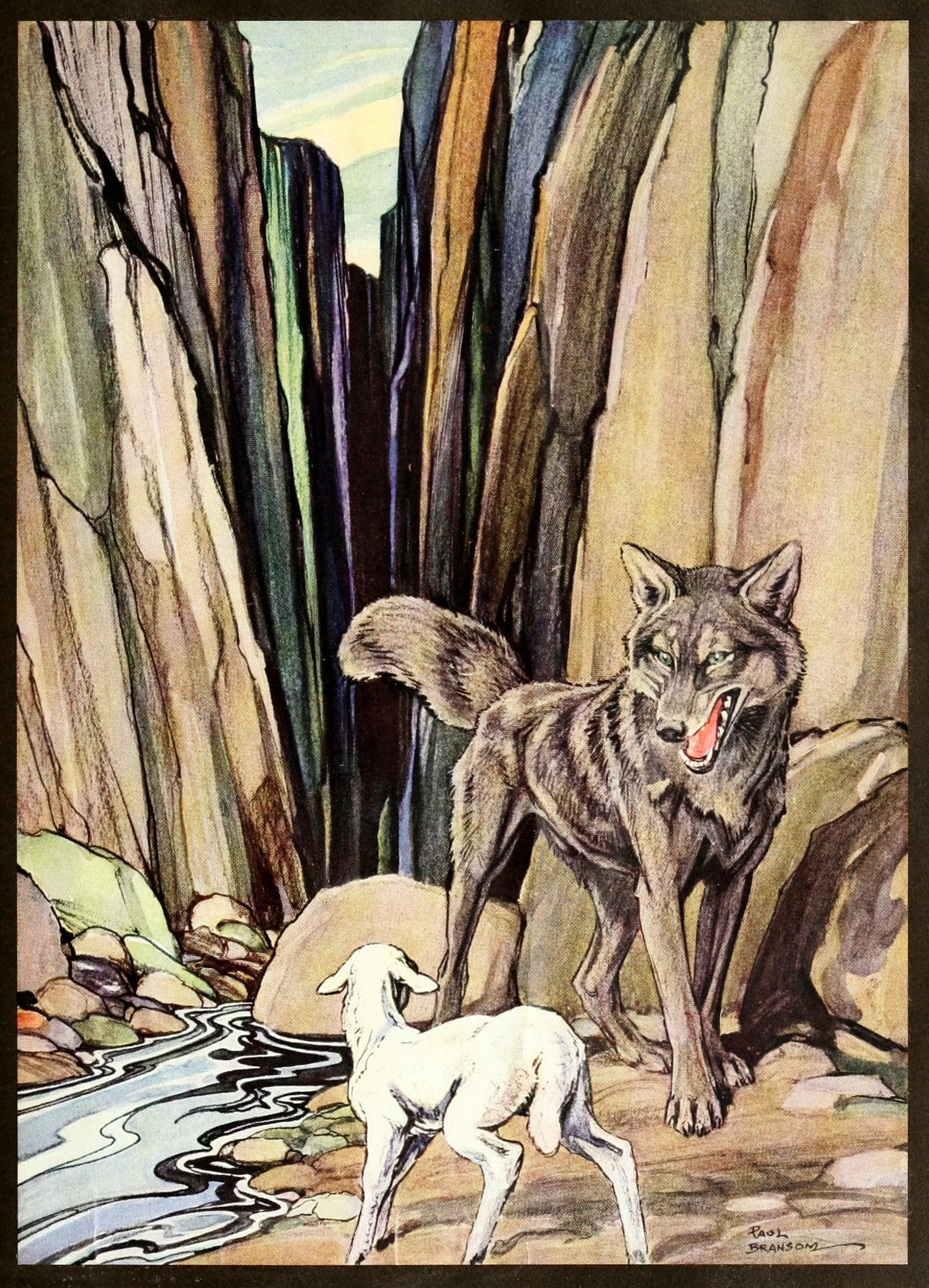
Lamb and wolf, illus. by Bransom, ca. 1921

Aggression ever finds cause if sufficiently pressed.
Two wolves on the prowl had trapped a lamb in the forest
And were about to pounce. Quoth the lamb: "What right have you?"
"You're toothsome, weak, in the wood." — The wolves dined sans ado.

=== Bread and Sword ===
As the bread lay next to the sword, the weapon demurred:
"You would certainly show me more respect if you heard
How by night and by day I conscientiously strive
So that you may safely go on keeping men alive."
"I know," said the bread, "the shape of your duty's course:
You defend me less often than you take me by force."

=== The King and the Scribes ===
A certain king, full of ideas and enterprise,
Decreed a register of the happy and the wise.
The scribe who recorded the happy, found almost none;
The one who listed the wise, did out of paper run.

=== Man and Wolf ===
Man was traveling in wolfskin when wolf stopped his way.
"Know from my garb," said the man, "what I am, what I may."
The wolf first laughed out loud, then grimly said to the man:
"I know that you are weak, if you need another's skin."

=== Compassion ===
The sheep was praising the wolf for all his compassion;
Hearing it, fox asked her: "How is that? In what fashion?"
"Very much so!" says the sheep, "I owe him what I am.
He's mild! He could've eaten me, but just ate my lamb."

=== The Neighborhood ===
Rye sprouted up on land that, until then, fallow lay.
But to what avail when, all about, bramble held sway.
The soil was good, though it had never been touched by plow;
It would have brought forth grain, did the bramble this allow.

Happy is the man who with equals shares his border!

Bad be famine, war, bad air; but worse still, bad neighbor.

=== Refractory Oxen ===
Pleasant the beginnings, but lamentable the end.
In spring, the oxen to their plowing would not attend;
They would not carry the grain to the barn in the fall;
Came winter, bread ran out, the farmer ate them withal.

=== The Drunkard ===
Having spent at the bottle many a night and day,
The ailing drunkard threw his mugs and glasses away;
He declared wine a tyrant, reviled beer, cursed out mead.
Then, his health restored... he'd no longer abstinence heed.

Translated from the Polish by Christopher Kasparek.

== See also ==
- "The Blind Man and the Lame"
- Fable
- Monitor (Polish newspaper)
- "O Sacred Love of the Beloved Country"
- Parable
- Poetry
- Political fiction
- "The Wolf and the Lamb"
