= Julian Wojtkowski =

Polish Roman Catholic bishop (1927–2026)

The Most Reverend Julian Wojtkowski
- Auxiliary Bishop Emeritus of Warmia
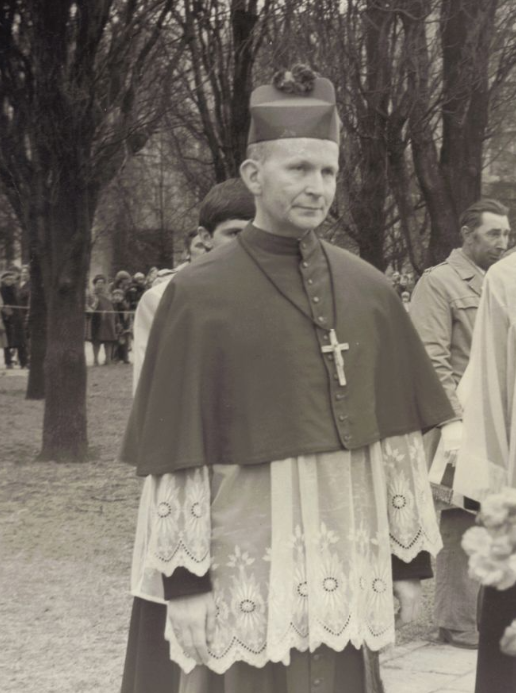
- Wojtkowski in 1981
- Church: Roman Catholic Church
- Archdiocese: Warmia
- Appointed: 17 August 1969
- Term ended: 24 February 2004
- Other post: Titular Bishop of Murustaga (1969–2026)

Orders
- Ordination: 25 June 1950 by Piotr Kałwa
- Consecration: 22 August 1969 by Stefan Wyszyński, Józef Drzazga and Jan Władysław Obłąk

Personal details
- Born: Julian Andrzej Antoni Wojtkowski; 31 January 1927 Poznań, Poland
- Died: 4 February 2026 (aged 99) Olsztyn, Poland
- Motto: Veni Domine Jesu (Come, Lord Jesus)

Julian Andrzej Antoni Wojtkowski (31 January 1927 – 4 February 2026) was a Polish Roman Catholic prelate and theologian, who served as Auxiliary Bishop of the Archdiocese of Warmia from 1969 until his resignation in 2004. He also held the titular see of Murustaga.

== Early life and education ==
Wojtkowski was born in Poznań on 31 January 1927. During World War II, he and his family were arrested and interned in German camps, including Lager Głowno – Posen Ost, and later displaced to Ostrowiec Świętokrzyski. He completed secondary education through underground schooling and graduated from a mathematics and physics high school in Lublin in 1945.

He entered the Major Seminary in Lublin and studied for the priesthood for the Diocese of Warmia. Wojtkowski was ordained a priest on 25 June 1950 by Bishop Piotr Kałwa and received a licentiate in theology. He later pursued postgraduate studies in dogmatic theology at the Catholic University of Lublin, earning a doctorate in 1953.

== Academic and teaching career ==
Beginning in 1952, Wojtkowski taught at the Warmian Theological Seminary (Hosianum), the Warmian Theological Institute, and later at the University of Warmia and Mazury in Olsztyn. He habilitated at the Pontifical Faculty of Theology in Kraków in 1968.

He became a professor extraordinarius in 1987 and a professor ordinarius in 1997. His academic work focused on the history of Marian dogma in medieval Poland, early Polish glosses and texts in incunabula, and the history of the Diocese of Warmia. Over his career, he supervised numerous academic theses, including master's, licentiate, and doctoral dissertations.

== Episcopal ministry and later life ==
On 17 August 1969, Wojtkowski was appointed Auxiliary Bishop of Warmia and Titular Bishop of Murustaga by Pope Paul VI. He received episcopal consecration on 22 August 1969 in Warsaw, with Cardinal Stefan Wyszyński serving as principal consecrator, assisted by Bishops Józef Drzazga and Jan Władysław Obłąk.

His episcopal motto was Veni Domine Jesu. As a bishop, he was an active member of the Polish Episcopal Conference, serving as chairman of the Commission for Church Buildings, secretary of the Commission for the Catholic University of Lublin, and a member of councils dealing with migration, tourism, and pilgrimages.

He served as auxiliary bishop until his resignation was accepted by Pope John Paul II on 24 February 2004.

Wojtkowski died at the Priests' Residence in Olsztyn, on 4 February 2026, at the age of 99.

Catholic Church titles
Preceded by —	Auxiliary Bishop of Warmia; 1969–2004	Succeeded by —
Preceded by George Brunner	Titular Bishop of Murustaga; 1969–2026	Succeeded by Vacant
