= Primate's Higher Theological Seminary =

Catholic seminary in Gniezno, Poland

- Prymasowskie Wyższe Seminarium Duchowne w Gnieźnie
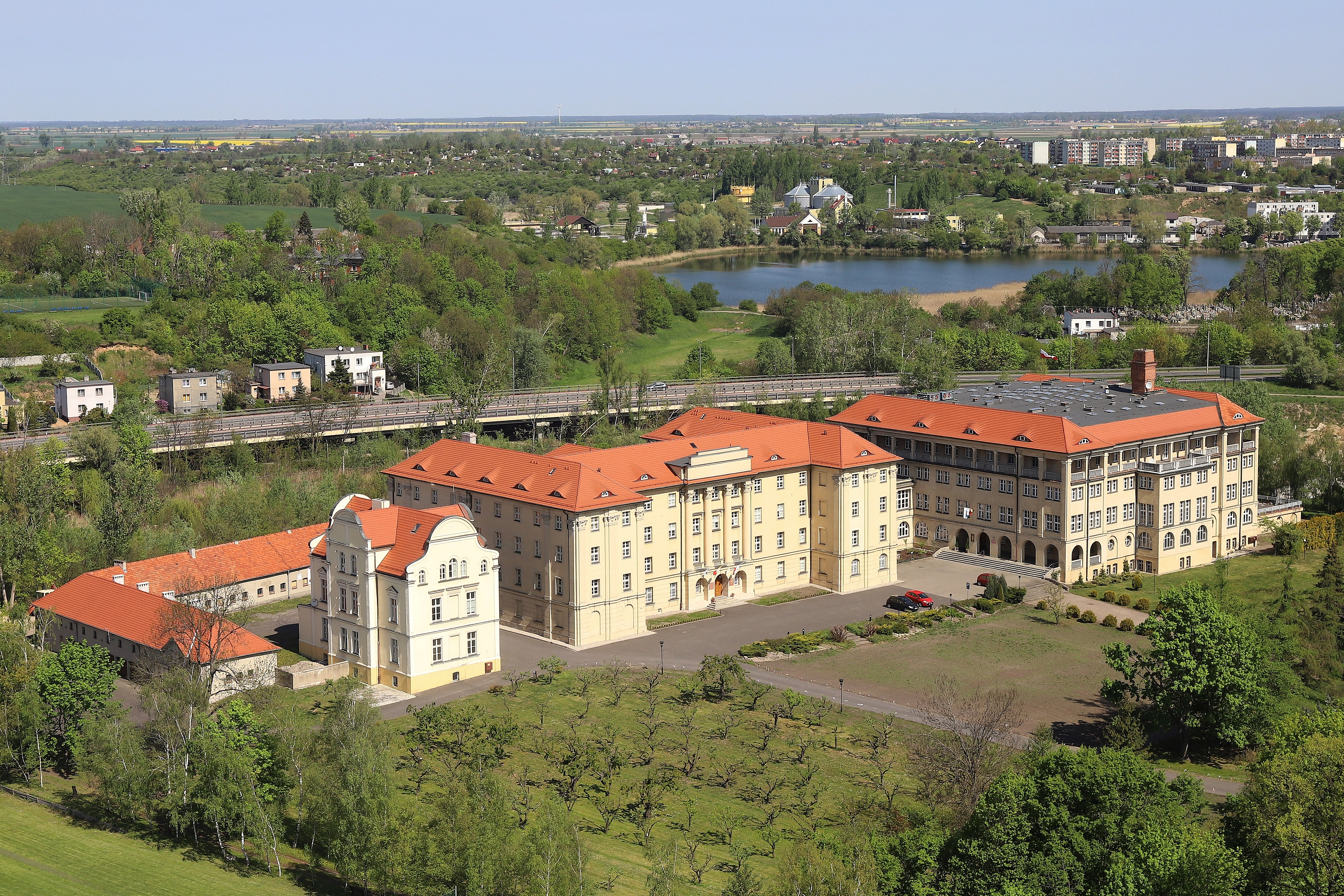
- Type: Seminary
- Active: 26 November 1602–30 April 2023 (temporarily)
- Address: 2 Seminaryjna Street, Gniezno, Poland; 52°32′21″N 17°35′32″E
- Campus: Urban
- Affiliations: Faculty of Theology, Adam Mickiewicz University in Poznań
- Website: www.pwsd.archidiecezja.pl

The Primate's Higher Theological Seminary was a seminary of the Archdiocese of Gniezno in the Latin Church, located in Gniezno, Poland. Established on 26 November 1602 by Primate Stanisław Karnkowski in Łowicz, it operated until its temporary closure on 30 April 2023. Until 1998, it was part of the Pontifical Faculty of Theology in Poznań. It later became an external section of the Faculty of Theology at Adam Mickiewicz University in Poznań. Canonical jurisdiction over the seminary was held by the Archbishop of Gniezno, Primate of Poland. Until 1 July 2023, the rector was Rev. Dr. Przemysław Kwiatkowski. From that date, Rev. Dr. Tomasz Krzysztofiak served as acting rector and the archbishop's delegate for the formation of seminarians, residing at the Archiepiscopal Seminary of Poznań during his appointment.

== History ==
The first seminary in the Archdiocese of Gniezno was founded in 1581 in Kalisz by Primate Stanisław Karnkowski. The Gniezno seminary was established by Karnkowski in Łowicz on 26 November 1602. The following year, the foundation was approved by King Sigismund III Vasa, and in 1605, it received confirmation from the Holy See, marking the start of its formal operations. In 1621, the Kalisz seminary was relocated to Gniezno. The original wooden seminary building in Gniezno deteriorated due to lack of maintenance and was uninhabitable by 1700. A new building was constructed at the current site in 1783, including the ground floor of the present structure and the Chapel of the Annunciation of the Blessed Virgin Mary.

During the Prussian Partition, authorities repeatedly attempted to close the seminary, but it remained operational through the efforts of successive ordinaries. In the mid-19th century, Archbishop Marcin Dunin established a joint seminary for the archdioceses of Gniezno and Poznań. The program involved three years of theoretical training in Poznań, followed by practical training in Gniezno, known as Seminarium Clericorum Practicum (Practical Seminary), until 1927. During the Kulturkampf, the Prussian government closed both seminaries in 1875. Seminarians studied abroad in cities such as Rome, Innsbruck, and Münster.

After World War I, the seminary's operations mirrored those of the late 19th century. Between 1927 and 1939, the building was significantly expanded with the addition of second and third floors and wings. In 1938, the seminary had 66 seminarians. The last pre-war rector was Blessed Michał Kozal, later Bishop of Włocławek. During World War II (1940–1945), the seminary ceased training priests. The building, occupied by German forces, served initially as a military hospital and later as a police school for Volksdeutsche under the Schutzpolizei, the first such school in the Reichsgau Wartheland. The building was remodelled into German-style barracks, destroying historic interiors, and rubble from the demolished Gniezno synagogue was used for a training ground. The seminary's library was relocated to St. Michael Church in Poznań.

From 1948, the pre-war model resumed, with philosophical studies in Gniezno and theological studies in Poznań. In 1949, Archbishop Stefan Wyszyński opened a Minor Seminary in Gniezno, housed in the nearby archiepiscopal dormitory. In 1953, the Gniezno and Poznań seminaries were separated, each offering a full six-year formation cycle. On 7 September 1974, Cardinal Wyszyński transferred ownership of the Church of St. George to the seminary. During his visit to Gniezno on 3–4 June 1979, Pope John Paul II met with the seminary's professors and seminarians. That year, Wyszyński approved the construction of a second building to improve living conditions, as the original was designed for 120 seminarians but housed up to 200 in the 1970s. The cornerstone was laid on 15 November 1982 by Cardinal Józef Glemp and Rector Bogdan Józef Wojtuś, later auxiliary bishop emeritus. Construction was completed in 1990. The new building included an auditorium, lecture halls, the Chapel of Jesus, Master of the Apostles, seminarian rooms, and faculty apartments.

Until 1998, classes were held under the Pontifical Faculty of Theology. After its integration into the Faculty of Theology at Adam Mickiewicz University, Gniezno became an external section. The seminary's 400th anniversary was celebrated on 16 November 2002. In the 2016/2017 academic year, the Educational and Formation Centre was established in the new building, and all seminary facilities were moved to the renovated old building.

On 2 February 2018, the Primate of Poland introduced a propaedeutic year, per the 2017 Polish Bishops' Conference guidelines. This year began in the 2019/2020 academic year, with seminarians undertaking formation at the former Oblate monastery in Markowice.

On 30 April 2023, Primate Archbishop Wojciech Polak announced the suspension of the seminary's operations from the 2023/24 academic year due to a lack of candidates, with seminarian formation transferred to Poznań.

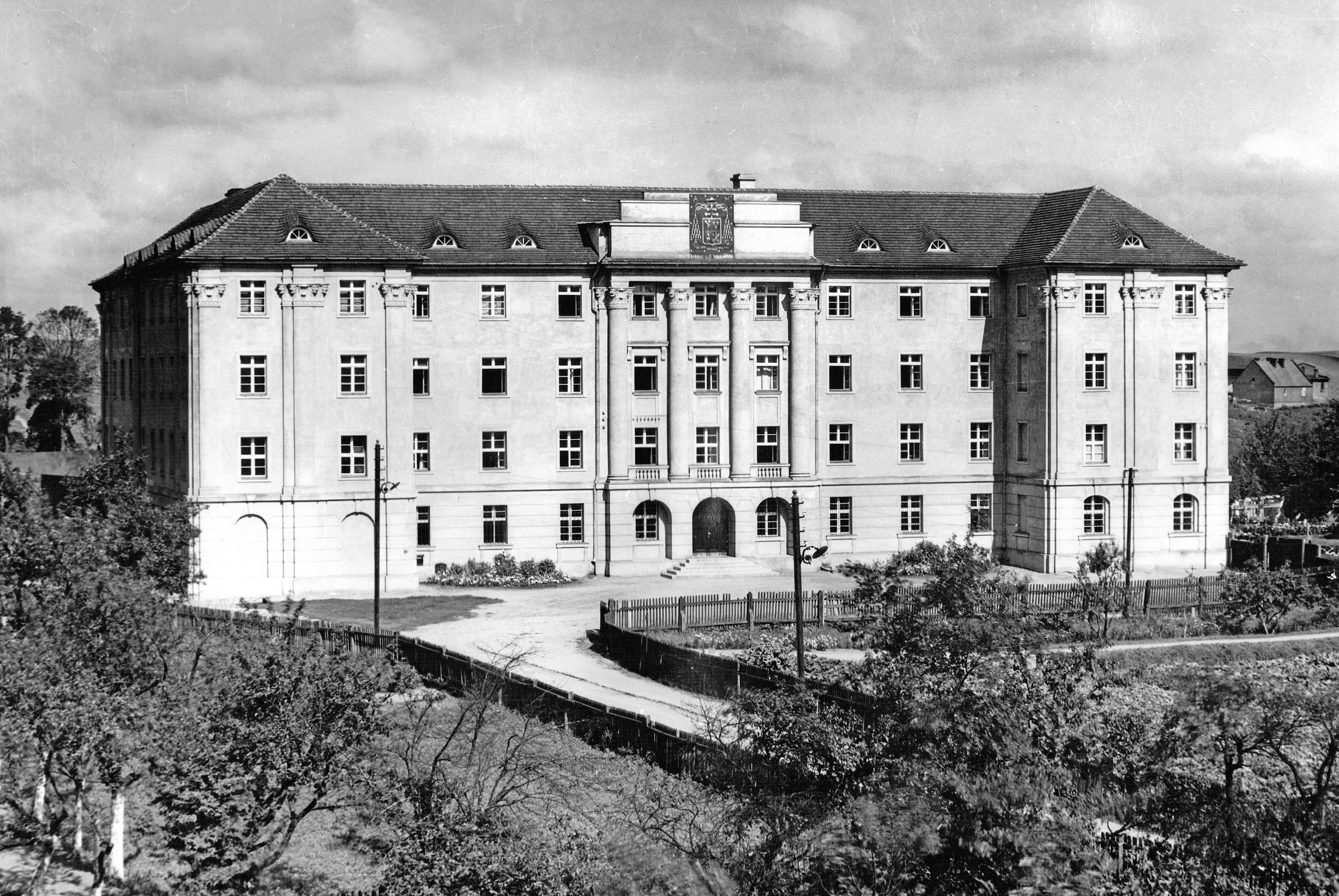
Old Seminary Building (1938)

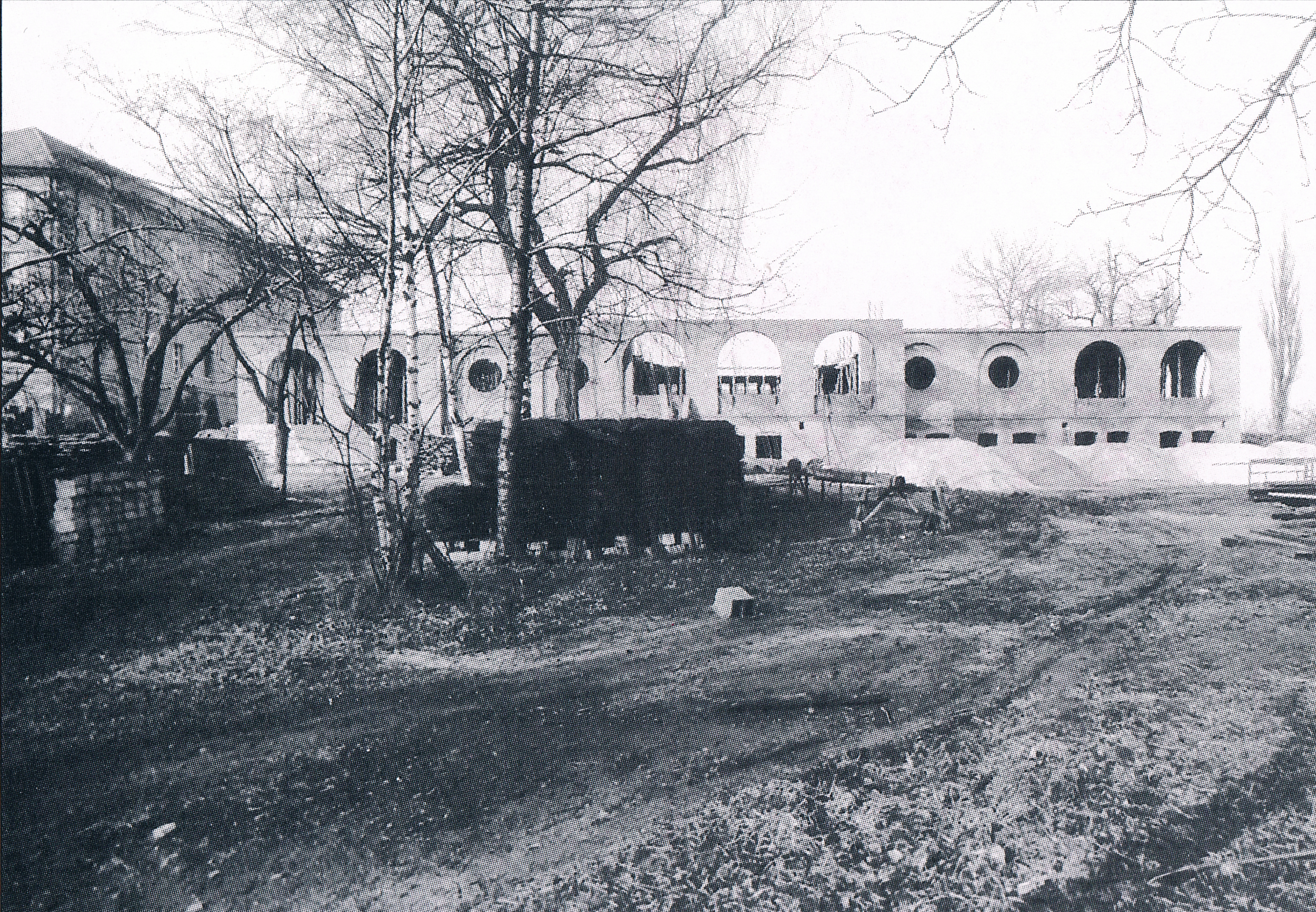
Construction of the New Seminary Building (1983)

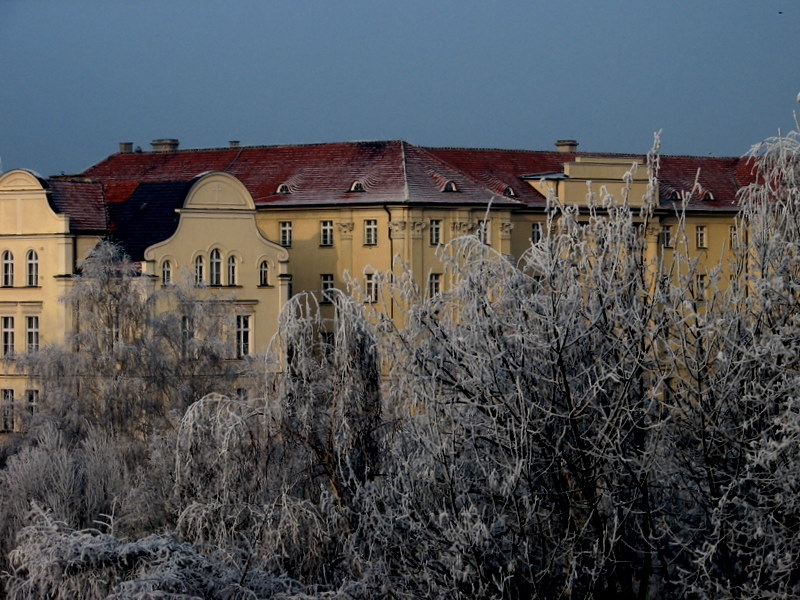
View of the Seminary from Lech Hill (2007)

== Rectors through history ==
The following individuals served as rectors of the Primate's Higher Theological Seminary:

1. Michał Sabinus (?–1616),
2. Jakub Dubius (1616–1624),
3. Bartłomiej Januszewicz (1624–1628),
4. J. Dubius (1628–1638),
5. Maciej Burszowic (1638–1643),
6. Wojciech Łańcucki (1643–1646),
7. Adam Piątkowicz (1646),
8. Kacper Paweł Chudziński (1647–1665),
9. Stefan Damalewicz (1665–1666),
10. Marcin Łękowski (1666–1668),
11. Jan Kursiński (1668–?),
12. Jan Modrzyński (?–1687),
13. Kazimierz Pathun (1687–1694),
14. Sebastian Jeliński (1694–1699),
15. Mateusz Jagielski (1700–1703),
16. Józef Mniszkiewicz (1712–?),
17. Kruszyński (1717–1718),
18. Jakub Stanisław Mroczek (1718–1725),
19. Piotr Potyralski (1726–1728),
20. Jan Więckowski (1728–1734),
21. Stanisław Skrzeszewski (1734–1736),
22. Walenty Stanisław Jankowski (1736–1737),
23. Maciej Kazimierz Kowalski (1737–1741),
24. Jan Konstanty Kossobucki (1741–1751),
25. Jakub Włodarski (1751–1754),
26. Józef Maszterowski (1754–1762),
27. Michał Józef Ziemiakiewicz (1762–1768),
28. Kajetan Narzymski (1768–1776),
29. Jan Długaj (1776–1795),
30. Józef Jakubowski (1795–1796),
31. Adolf Józef Faltynowski (1796–1828),
32. Antonin Kupczyński (1828–1836),
33. Jan Kanty Dąbrowski (1836–1841),
34. Andrzej Kidaszewski (1841–1849),
35. Józef Frasunkiewicz (1849–1853),
36. Franciszek Ksawery Duliński (1853–1866),
37. Józef Cybichowski (1867–1875),
38. Antoni Andrzejewicz (1886–1890),
39. Jan Nepomucen Łukowski (1890–1892),
40. Ignacy Goczkowski (1892–1903),
41. Wilhelm Atanazy Kloske (1903–1914),
42. Jerzy Beyer (1915–1924),
43. Stanisław Kopernik (1924–1927),
44. Aleksander Żychliński (1927–1929),
45. Michał Kozal (1929–1939),
46. Antoni Banaszak (1939),
47. Kazimierz Józef Kowalski (1945–1946),
48. Aleksy Wietrzykowski (1946–1947),
49. Józef Pacyna (1947–1963),
50. Kazimierz Więckowski (1963–1970),
51. Jan Wiktor Nowak (1970–1982),
52. Bogdan Wojtuś (1982–1988),
53. Teofil Wilski (1989–1995),
54. Andrzej Kozakowski (1995–1999),
55. Wojciech Polak (1999–2003),
56. Bogdan Czyżewski (2003–2007),
57. Wojciech Rzeszowski (2007–2016)
58. Przemysław Kwiatkowski (2016–2023)
59. p.o. Tomasz Krzysztofiak (from 2023)

== Current leadership ==
- Acting Rector: Rev. Dr. Tomasz Krzysztofiak, delegated to serve at the Archbishop's Seminary in Poznań.
- Spiritual Father: Rev. Dr. Andrzej Nowicki, delegated to serve at the Archbishop's Seminary in Poznań.
- Propaedeutic Year Prefect: Rev. Mgr. Paweł Rybak, delegated to serve at the Archbishop's Seminary in Poznań.

== Academic staff ==
In the 2019/2020 academic year, the seminary employed 14 faculty members from the Poznań Faculty of Theology, including four full professors, seven associate professors, and two assistant professors. Additionally, 19 other academic staff were employed, including 11 with doctoral degrees, one doctoral candidate, and two lecturers in English and German.

== Academic programme ==
The seminary offered a unified master's degree programme, with the first two years focused on philosophical studies and the subsequent four on theological studies. The curriculum was designed for one field and specialisation: theology with a priestly focus. The sixth year culminated in the submission and defence of a master's thesis in theology, earning graduates a Master of Theology degree.

Seminarians engaged in pastoral placements, assisting at Gniezno hospital wards, a special education centre, a care facility for disabled individuals, a nearby prison, and a social welfare home in Mielżyn.

== Buildings ==
From the 2016/2017 academic year, per Archbishop Wojciech Polak, the seminary operated in the renovated old building, while the new building was repurposed as the Educational and Formation Centre. The old building houses two chapels: the historic Chapel of the Annunciation of the Blessed Virgin Mary and a 2005 chapel dedicated to the Blessed Martyrs of World War II. It also contains the seminary library with over 72,000 volumes, lecture halls, administrative offices, a kitchen, dining halls, seminarian rooms, and faculty apartments, accommodating 55 seminarians. The new building includes the Chapel of Jesus Christ, Master of the Apostles, featuring a mosaic of Jesus with the apostles, a modern auditorium, lecture halls, offices, and rooms for 55 guests.

== Seminary logo ==
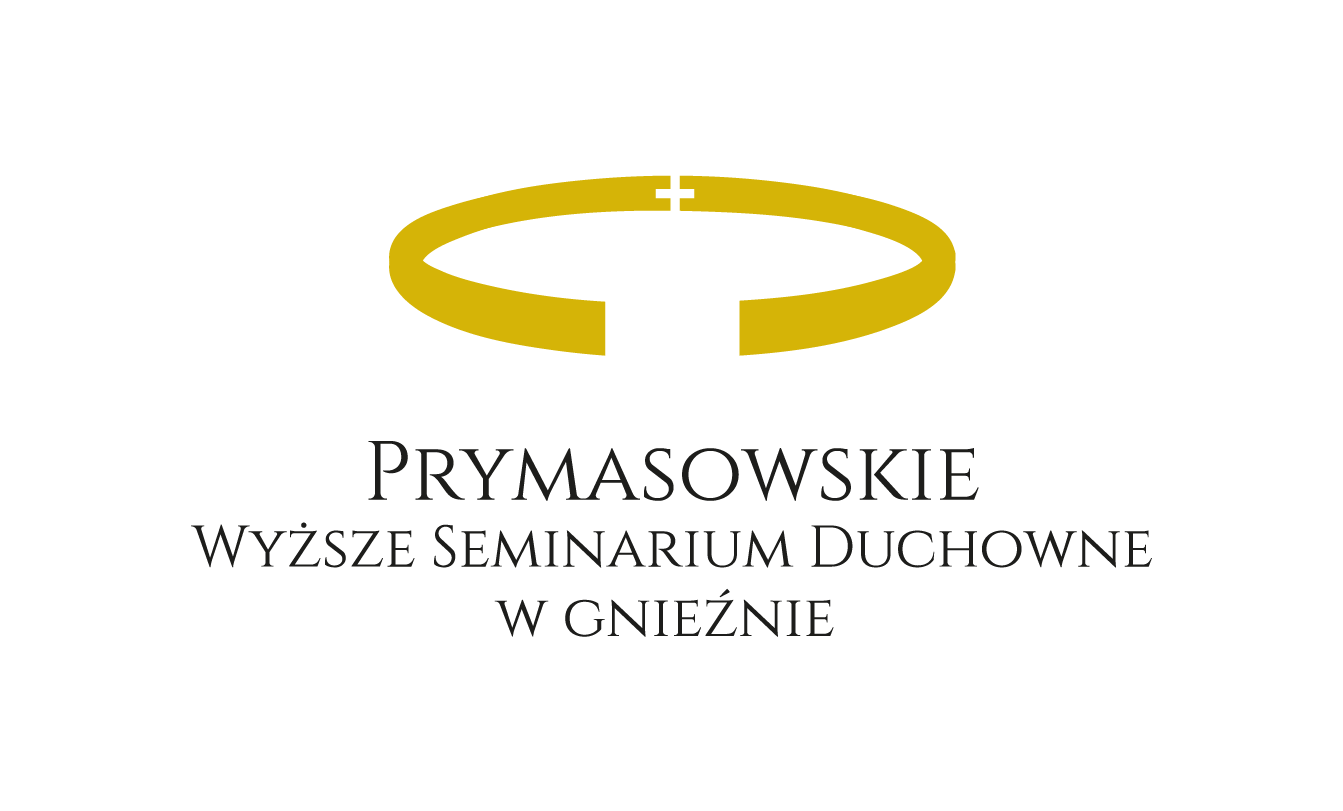
Logo of the Primate's Higher Theological Seminary

In 2016, the seminary community, collaborating with Anna Kwaśna, developed a new visual identity. The logo reflects the institution's Christian mission and its primatial heritage. It conveys three main meanings:

- Priesthood, symbolised by a clerical collar.
- Holiness, represented by a halo.
- Preparation for the sacrament or sacramental union with God, depicted as a ring.
