= Kołaczkowo =

Kołaczkowo may refer to the following places:

- Kołaczkowo, Gniezno County in Greater Poland Voivodeship (west-central Poland)
- Kołaczkowo, Września County in Greater Poland Voivodeship (west-central Poland)
- Kołaczkowo, Kuyavian-Pomeranian Voivodeship (north-central Poland)
