= Odrowąż =

Odrowąż may refer to several places:

- Odrowąż, Lesser Poland Voivodeship (south Poland)
- Odrowąż, Opoczno County in Łódź Voivodeship (central Poland)
- Odrowąż, Radomsko County in Łódź Voivodeship (central Poland)
- Odrowąż, Świętokrzyskie Voivodeship (south-central Poland)
- Odrowąż, Greater Poland Voivodeship (west-central Poland)
- Odrowąż, Opole Voivodeship (south-west Poland)

== See also ==
- Odrowąż family
- Odrowąż coat of arms
