= Edmund Michał Piszcz =

Polish Roman Catholic archbishop (1929–2022)

His Excellency Edmund Michał Piszcz
- Archbishop Emeritus of Warmia
- Diocese: Warmia
- Appointed: 25 March 1992
- Term ended: 30 May 2006
- Successor: Wojciech Ziemba
- Previous posts: Auxiliary Bishop of Chelmno (1982–1985); Titular Bishop of Aurusuliana (1982–1988); Bishop of Warmia (1988–1992)

Orders
- Ordination: 10 May 1956 by Kazimierz Jósef Kowalski
- Consecration: 20 May 1982 by Józef Glemp

Personal details
- Born: 17 November 1929 Bydgoszcz, Poland
- Died: 22 March 2022 (aged 92) Olsztyn, Poland

Edmund Michał Piszcz (17 November 1929 – 22 March 2022) was, from 22 October 1988, the bishop of Warmia, Poland. On 25 March 1992, he was promoted to the rank of archbishop, together with his diocese, the Archbishopric of Warmia. He retired on 30 May 2006.

He was awarded the German Bundesverdienstkreuz (Großes Verdienstkreuz des Verdienstordens der Bundesrepublik Deutschland) on 28 October 2004 for supporting German-Polish understanding, in e.g. keeping contacts to the members of Federation of Expellees from Ermland (Warmia).

Catholic Church titles
Preceded by Jan Władysław Obłąk	Bishop of Warmia; 1988–2006	Succeeded by Wojciech Ziemba
Preceded by Gilberto Pereira Lopes	Titular Bishop of Aurusuliana; 1982–1988	Succeeded by Kamal Hanna Bathish
