= Krzyżówka =

Krzyżówka may refer to the following places:

- Krzyżówka, Gniezno County in Greater Poland Voivodeship (west-central Poland)
- Krzyżówka, Lesser Poland Voivodeship (south Poland)
- Krzyżówka, Masovian Voivodeship (east-central Poland)
