= Wierzchowiska, Greater Poland Voivodeship =

Wierzchowiska
- Village
- Location within Poland
- Coordinates: 52°28′48″N 17°47′17″E
- Country: Poland
- Voivodeship: Greater Poland
- County: Gniezno
- Gmina: Witkowo

Wierzchowiska [vjɛʂxɔˈviska] is a village in the administrative district of Gmina Witkowo, within Gniezno County, Greater Poland Voivodeship, in west-central Poland.
