= Czajki, Greater Poland Voivodeship =

Czajki
- Village
- Location within Poland
- Coordinates: 52°23′16″N 17°42′51″E
- Country: Poland
- Voivodeship: Greater Poland
- County: Gniezno
- Gmina: Witkowo

Czajki [ˈt͡ʂai̯ki] is a village in the administrative district of Gmina Witkowo, within Gniezno County, Greater Poland Voivodeship, in west-central Poland.
