= Witkówko =

- Village
- Location within Poland
- Coordinates: 52°27′N 17°45′E
- Country: Poland
- Voivodeship: Greater Poland
- County: Gniezno
- Gmina: Witkowo
- Population: 60

Witkówko [vitˈkufkɔ] is a village in the administrative district of Gmina Witkowo, within Gniezno County, Greater Poland Voivodeship, in west-central Poland.
