= Kamionka, Gniezno County =

Kamionka
- Village
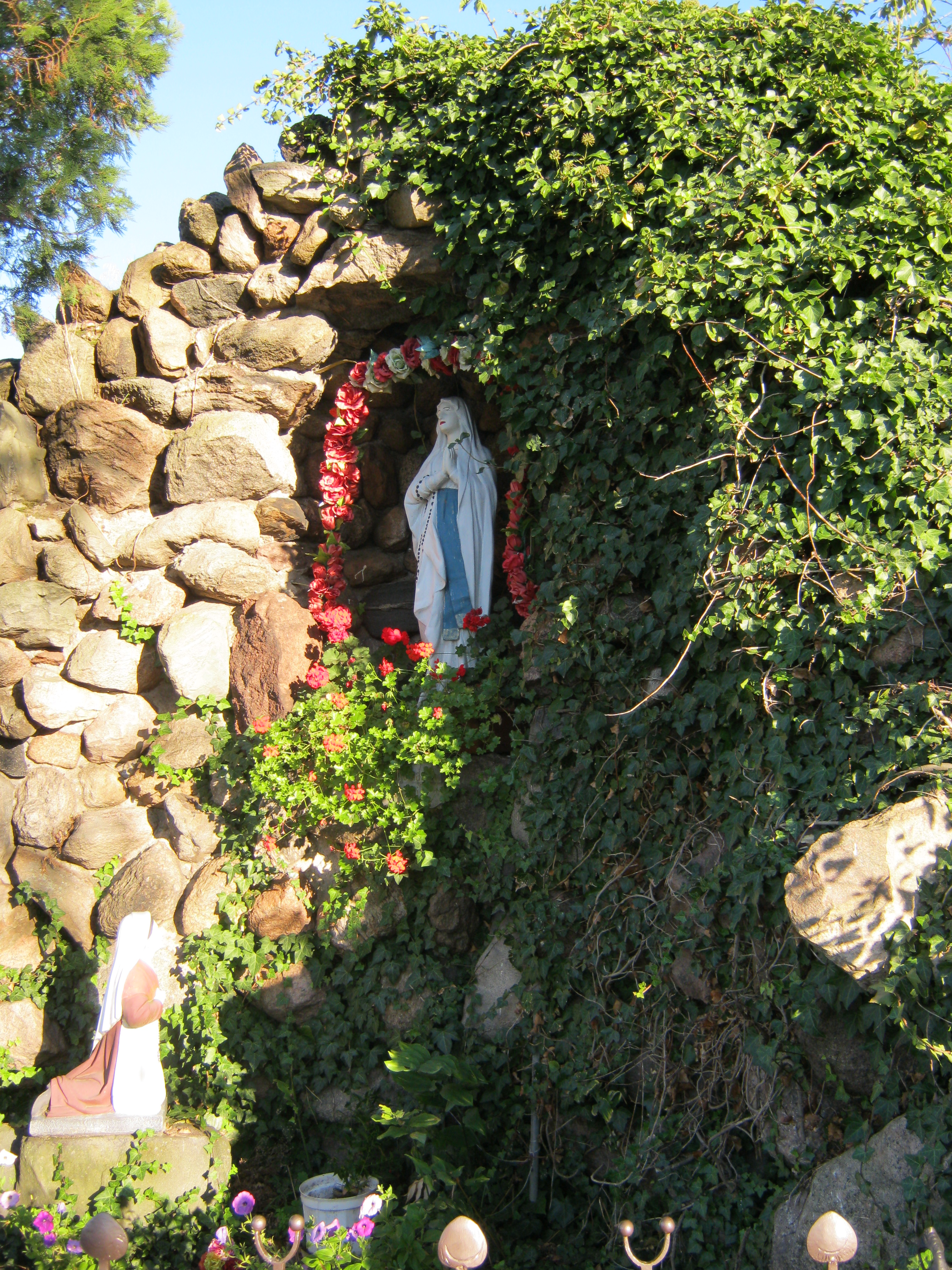

- Location within Poland
- Coordinates: 52°27′45″N 17°49′10″E
- Country: Poland
- Voivodeship: Greater Poland
- County: Gniezno
- Gmina: Witkowo
- Time zone: UTC+1 (CET)
  - Summer (DST): UTC+2 (CEST)
- Vehicle registration: PGN

Kamionka ([kaˈmjɔnka]; German: Kamionka, 1939–43 Steinwall, 1943–45 Steindorf) is a village in the administrative district of Gmina Witkowo, within Gniezno County, Greater Poland Voivodeship, in west-central Poland.
