= Skorzęcin-Nadleśnictwo =

- Settlement
- Location within Poland
- Coordinates: 52°28′19″N 17°50′58″E
- Country: Poland
- Voivodeship: Greater Poland
- County: Gniezno
- Gmina: Witkowo

Skorzęcin-Nadleśnictwo [skɔˈʐɛnt͡ɕin nadlɛɕˈnit͡stfɔ] is a settlement in the administrative district of Gmina Witkowo, within Gniezno County, Greater Poland Voivodeship, in west-central Poland.

It includes the buildings of the former Skorzęcin forest inspectorate, existing in the years 1821–1975.
