= Stanisław Wielgus =

Polish prelate of the Catholic Church (born 1939)

His Excellency Stanisław Wielgus
- Titular Archbishop of Viminacium
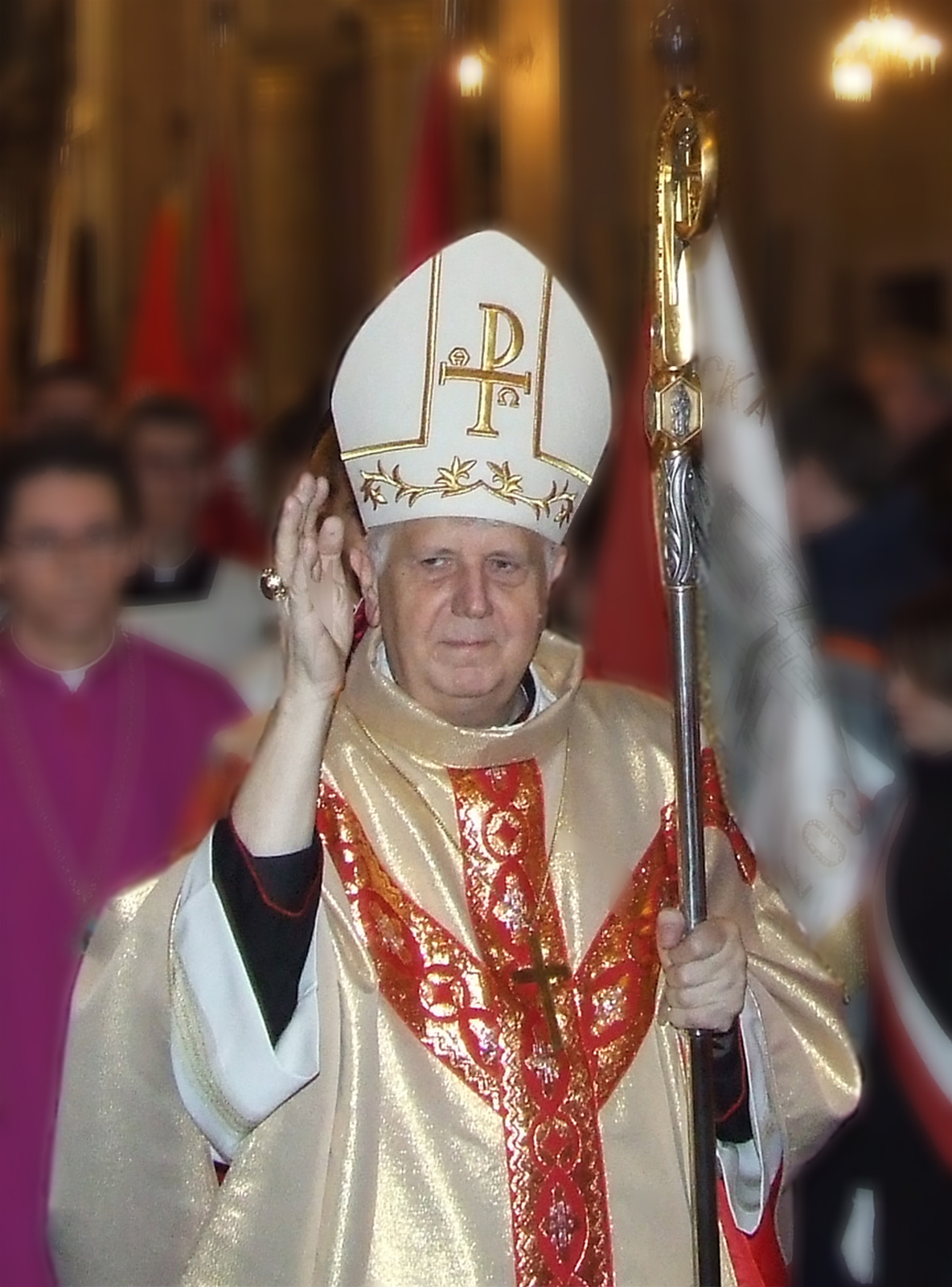
- Appointed: 7 January 2007
- Predecessor: Franco Brambilla
- Previous posts: Bishop of Płock (1999–2006); Archbishop of Warsaw (2007)

Orders
- Ordination: 10 June 1962 by Piotr Kałwa
- Consecration: 1 August 1999 by Józef Glemp

Personal details
- Born: Stanisław Wojciech Wielgus; 23 April 1939 (age 87) Wierzchowiska Drugie, Lublin Voivodeship
- Denomination: Roman Catholic
- Education: Catholic University of Lublin
- Motto: Aeternae Sapientiae et Caritati (Eternal Wisdom and Love)
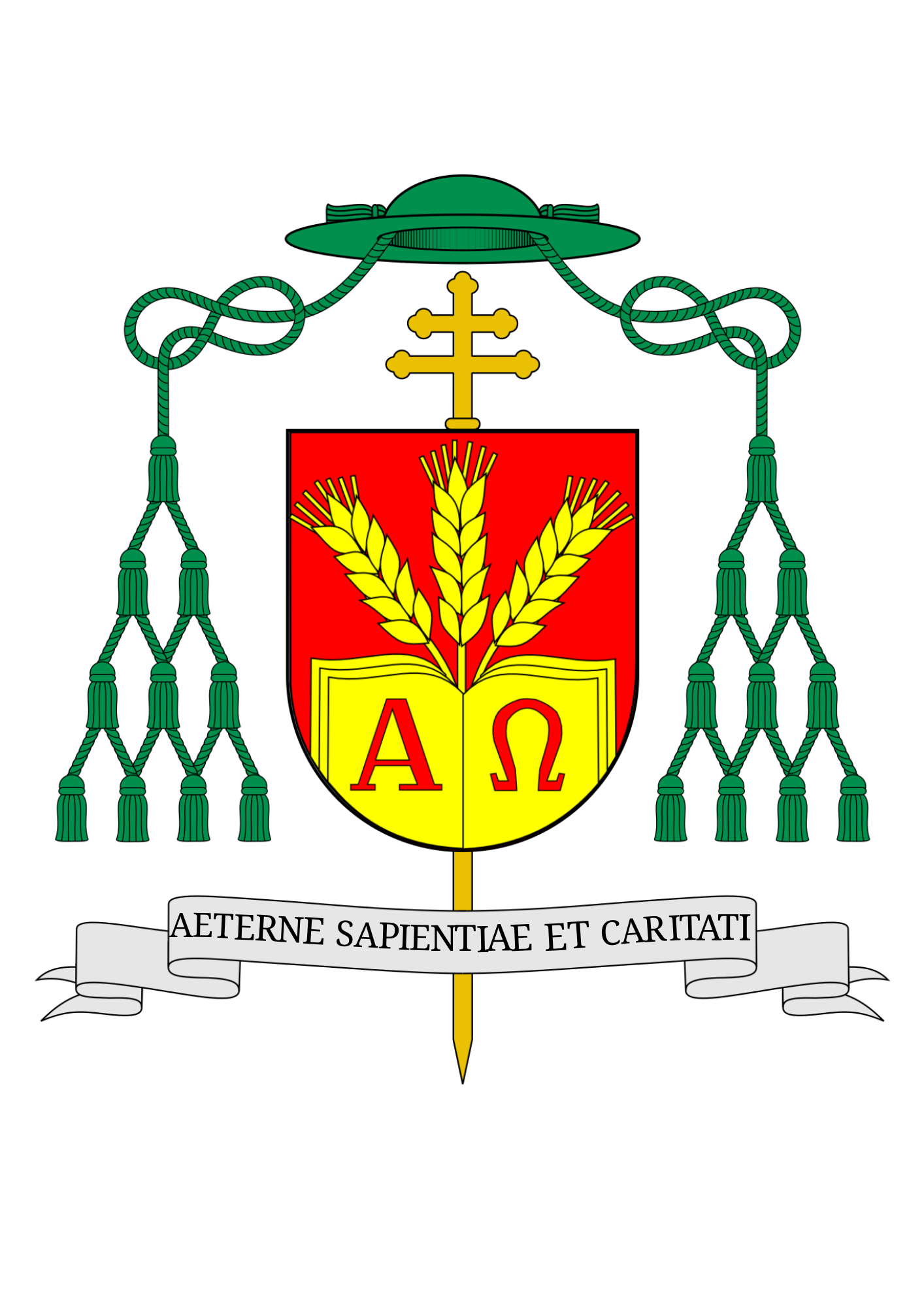
- Coat of arms

Styles of Stanisław Wielgus
- Reference style: The Most Reverend
- Spoken style: Your Excellency
- Religious style: Monsignor
- Posthumous style: n/a

Stanisław Wojciech Wielgus (born 23 April 1939) is a Polish prelate of the Catholic Church, who resigned his position as Archbishop of Warsaw on 6 January 2007, just one day after being installed in that post in a private ceremony, just before the start of his public installation, because of revelations that he cooperated with the Polish communist secret police decades earlier. He was Bishop of Płock from 1999 to 2007.

== Early years ==
Stanisław Wielgus was born in Wierzchowiska, in what is today Lublin Region, on 23 April 1939. He was ordained a priest on 10 June 1962 by Bishop Piotr Kałwa. From 1962 to 1969 he worked as a parish priest while continuing his specialized studies. An expert in Polish philosophy and medieval philosophy, he spent thirty years teaching in the faculty of philosophy of the Catholic University of Lublin Beginning in 1989 he served three terms as rector there. He taught at LMU Munich, from 1973 to 1975 and again in 1978, where Professor Joseph Ratzinger, the future Pope Benedict XVI, was teaching as an associate. From 1990 to 1993 he was the vice-chairman of the Conference of Rectors of Polish Universities. He served as a member and consultant on the Sacred Congregation for Catholic Education, and a member of the Humanities section of the European Academy of Sciences and Arts.

Wielgus was appointed Bishop of Płock on 24 May 1999 by Pope John Paul II, and was consecrated by Cardinal Józef Glemp on 1 August of that year.

As he concluded his service in Płock, he was made an honorary citizen of the city in recognition of "his work to develop knowledge, culture, and Christian beliefs".

== Archbishop of Warsaw ==
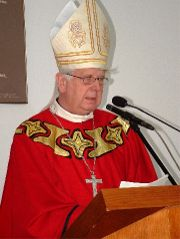
Stanisław Wielgus

He was named Archbishop of Warsaw by Pope Benedict XVI on 6 December 2006. He took formal canonical possession of the see as archbishop in a private ceremony on 5 January 2007.

=== Resignation ===
Wielgus was due to be installed publicly on 7 January at a solemn Mass in St. John's Cathedral in Warsaw. However, less than an hour before the ceremony, his resignation was announced by the Apostolic Nunciature to Poland. Pope Benedict XVI had accepted Wielgus's resignation the previous day, 6 January. Some reports indicate that his resignation followed consultations within the Vatican and with the Polish government involving Pope Benedict and Polish president Lech Kaczyński. Cardinal Giovanni Battista Re, Prefect of the Congregation for Bishops, explained to the Italian daily Corriere della Sera that Pope Benedict himself decided to dismiss Wielgus, saying that "...when Monsignor Wielgus was nominated, we did not know anything about his collaboration with the secret services," The Vatican spokesman, Father Federico Lombardi, said that "The behaviour of (Archbishop) Wielgus during the years of the communist regime in Poland seriously compromised his authority, even with the faithful." The Vatican announcement of his resignation provided no explanation.

Wielgus was then appointed titular archbishop of Viminacium, the practice followed in the case of a bishop who has resigned or been forced to resign from his see under special circumstances to avoid the honorary use of a title associated with his former see like archbishop emeritus of Warsaw.

=== Aftermath ===
A day after the Wielgus resignation, Father Janusz Bielanski resigned as rector of Wawel Cathedral in Kraków. According to a local church spokesman, Bielanski's resignation was "in connection with repeated allegations about his cooperation with the secret services" of the Communist era.

In February 2007 it emerged that Wielgus was preparing a court case to clear his name and would be represented by Marek Małecki, who recently succeeded in clearing the name of Małgorzata Niezabitowska, a former government press aide. Wielgus' guilt has already pronounced as beyond doubt by two independent historical committees.

On 12 February 2007, Pope Benedict wrote a letter to Wielgus that said: "I hope you will be working again for the Church in Poland".

In March 2007, the Polish newspaper Rzeczpospolita reported that Wielgus while Bishop of Plock failed to respond to reports that several of his priests were sexually abusing minors. Roman Marcinkowski, auxiliary Bishop of Płock, countered that official complaints had been lodged and said the charges were "fragmentary and based on gossip".

== Cooperation with the secret police ==
On 20 December 2006, journalists found documents from the dictatorship's archives according to which Archbishop Wielgus collaborated—or at least conversed—with the secret police during communist rule in Poland. This development was considered to be particularly significant in the context of post-communist Polish politics, because public figures, particularly politicians, can be officially censured and barred from holding public office if found to have collaborated with the Security Services (Polish: Służba Bezpieczeństwa) of the People's Republic of Poland (Polish: PRL, Polska Rzeczpospolita Ludowa). The process of review of the Security Service's files, known in Poland as lustration (Pol: Lustracja) has been the source of many political scandals in recent years. The Polish human rights ombudsman, Janusz Kochanowski, said on 4 January 2007 that there was evidence in the secret police archives that Archbishop Wielgus knowingly cooperated with the dictatorship.

Archbishop Wielgus acknowledged that he signed a cooperation statement in 1978, but insisted that he did so only under coercion and disputed the length and characterization of his contact as described in the published reports. He made a public statement on 4 January 2007 indicating that he only provided information concerning his own academic work, and that the reports seriously distorted the truth. However, according to Rzeczpospolita, Wielgus had a more extensive role than he admitted, and alleged that he provided information about student activities as far back as 1967, when he was a philosophy student at the Catholic University of Lublin. Archbishop Wielgus only acknowledged a relationship beginning in 1978. Wielgus asked the Polish Bishops' Conference to examine the files pertaining to him.

The day after the discovery of the incriminating documents on 20 December 2006, the Vatican Press Office announced that "The Holy See, in deciding the nomination of the new archbishop of Warsaw, took into consideration all the circumstances of his life, including those regarding his past" and said that Pope Benedict "has full trust in his excellency Msgr. Stanislaw Wielgus and, with full awareness, entrusted to him the mission of pastor of the Archdiocese of Warsaw".

The revelations concerning Wielgus were particularly shocking because one of his predecessors as archbishop of Warsaw was the notable opponent of Communist rule Stefan Wyszyński and the foremost priest of that era was Jerzy Popiełuszko, who was murdered by the Communist secret police.

== Sources ==
Catholic Church titles
Preceded by Zygmunt Kamiński	Bishop of Płock; 1999-2007	Succeeded by Piotr Libera
Preceded by Józef Glemp	Archbishop of Warsaw; 2007	Succeeded by Kazimierz Nycz
