= Piaski, Gniezno County =

Piaski
- Village
- Location within Poland
- Coordinates: 52°29′N 17°46′E
- Country: Poland
- Voivodeship: Greater Poland
- County: Gniezno
- Gmina: Witkowo
- Time zone: UTC+1 (CET)
  - Summer (DST): UTC+2 (CEST)
- Postal code: 62-230
- Vehicle registration: PGN

Piaski (Polish pronunciation: [ˈpjaskʲi]) is a village in the administrative district of Gmina Witkowo, within Gniezno County, Greater Poland Voivodeship, in west-central Poland.
