= Gmina Witkowo =

Gmina Witkowo Witkowo Commune
- Gmina
- Flag Coat of arms
- Interactive map of Gmina Witkowo
- Coordinates (Witkowo): 52°26′11″N 17°46′27″E
- Country: Poland
- Voivodeship: Greater Poland
- County: Gniezno
- Seat: Witkowo

Area
  - Total: 184.4 km^{2} (71.2 sq mi)

Population (2006)
  - Total: 13,446
  - Density: 72.92/km^{2} (188.9/sq mi)
  - Urban: 7,855
  - Rural: 5,591
- Website: http://www.witkowo.pl

Gmina Witkowo is an urban-rural gmina (administrative district) in Gniezno County, Greater Poland Voivodeship, in west-central Poland. Its seat is the town of Witkowo, which lies approximately 16 kilometres (10 mi) south-east of Gniezno and 59 km (37 mi) east of the regional capital Poznań.

The gmina covers an area of 184.4 square kilometres (71.2 sq mi), and as of 2006 its total population is 13,446 (out of which the population of Witkowo amounts to 7,855, and the population of the rural part of the gmina is 5,591).

== Villages ==
Apart from the town of Witkowo, Gmina Witkowo contains the villages and settlements of Chłądowo, Ćwierdzin, Czajki, Dębina, Folwark, Gaj, Głożyny, Gorzykowo, Jaworowo, Kamionka, Kołaczkowo, Królewiec, Krzyżówka, Mąkownica, Małachowo-Kępe, Małachowo-Szemborowice, Małachowo-Wierzbiczany, Małachowo-Złych Miejsc, Malenin, Mielżyn, Odrowąż, Ostrowite Prymasowskie, Piaski, Popielarze, Raszewo, Ruchocin, Ruchocinek, Skorzęcin, Skorzęcin-Nadleśnictwo, Sokołowo, Stary Dwór, Strzyżewo Witkowskie, Wiekowo, Wierzchowiska and Witkówko.

== Neighbouring gminas ==
Gmina Witkowo is bordered by the gminas of Gniezno, Niechanowo, Orchowo, Powidz, Strzałkowo, Trzemeszno and Września.
