= Małachowo-Szemborowice =

- Village
- Location within Poland
- Coordinates: 52°26′43″N 17°44′36″E
- Country: Poland
- Voivodeship: Greater Poland
- County: Gniezno
- Gmina: Witkowo
- Time zone: UTC+1 (CET)
  - Summer (DST): UTC+2 (CEST)

Małachowo-Szemborowice [mawaˈxɔvɔ ʂɛmbɔrɔˈvit͡sɛ] is a village in the administrative district of Gmina Witkowo, within Gniezno County, Greater Poland Voivodeship, in west-central Poland.

Małachowo-Szemborowice, historically also known as Małachowo-Samborowice, was a private village of Polish nobility, administratively located in the Gniezno County in the Kalisz Voivodeship in the Greater Poland Province of the Polish Crown.
