= Janusz Bielański =

Polish Roman Catholic priest (1939–2018)

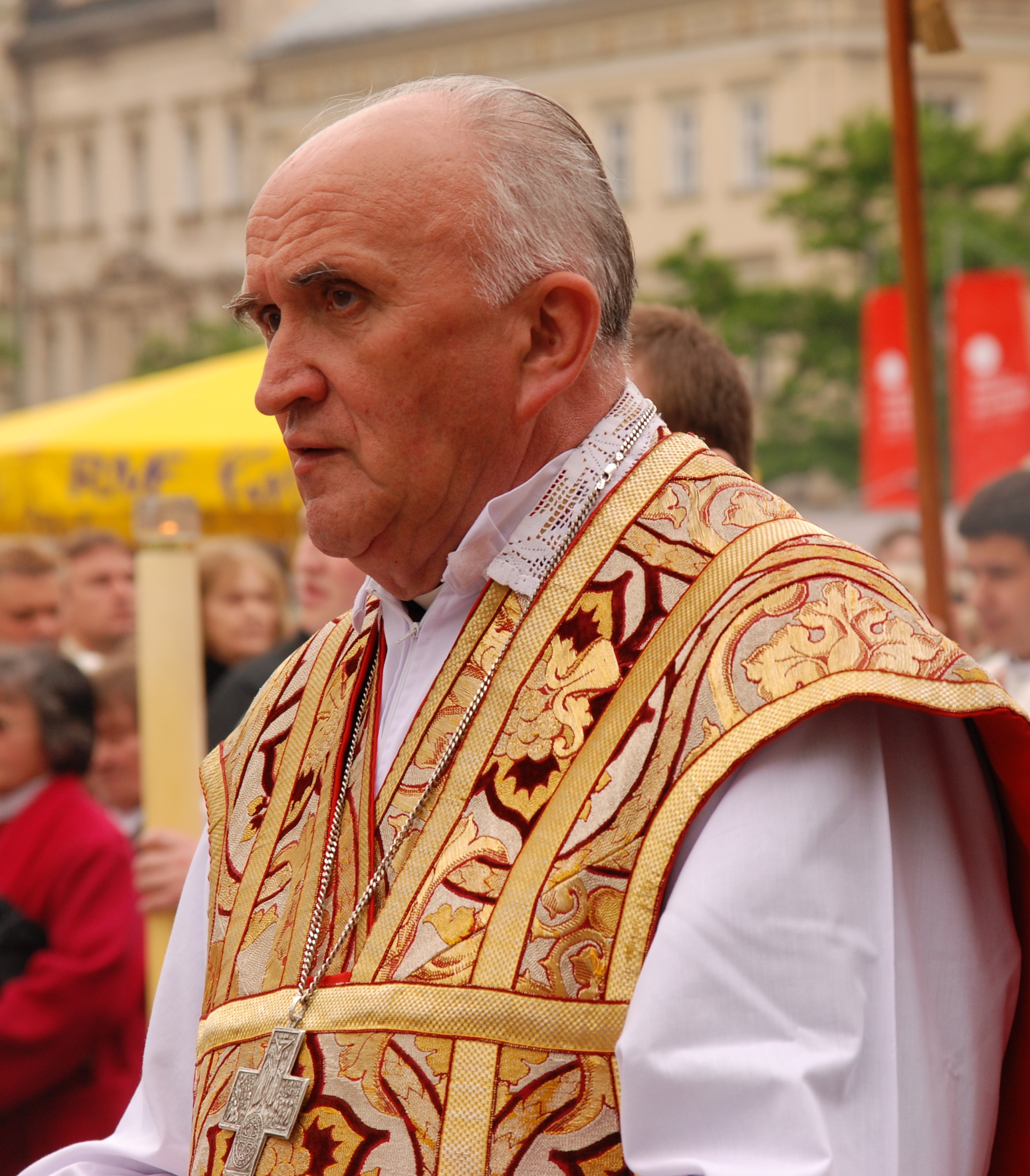

Rev. Janusz Bielanski (25 March 1939 – 3 November 2018) was a Roman Catholic priest and was the rector of the Wawel Cathedral in Kraków, Poland from 1983 until 2007. He resigned on January 8, 2007 after repeated allegations about his cooperation with the Służba Bezpieczeństwa—the communist-era secret police. Bielanski's resignation was announced the day after the resignation of Archbishop Stanisław Wielgus from the see of Warsaw. He served as a chaplain for foresters and one of the pastoral ministers for academic workers of the Archdiocese of Kraków. He died on November 3, 2018, in Kraków and was buried at the Salwator Cemetery (sector X-3-8).
