= Józef Glemp =

Polish cardinal

His Eminence Józef Glemp
- Archbishop of Warsaw; Primate of Poland
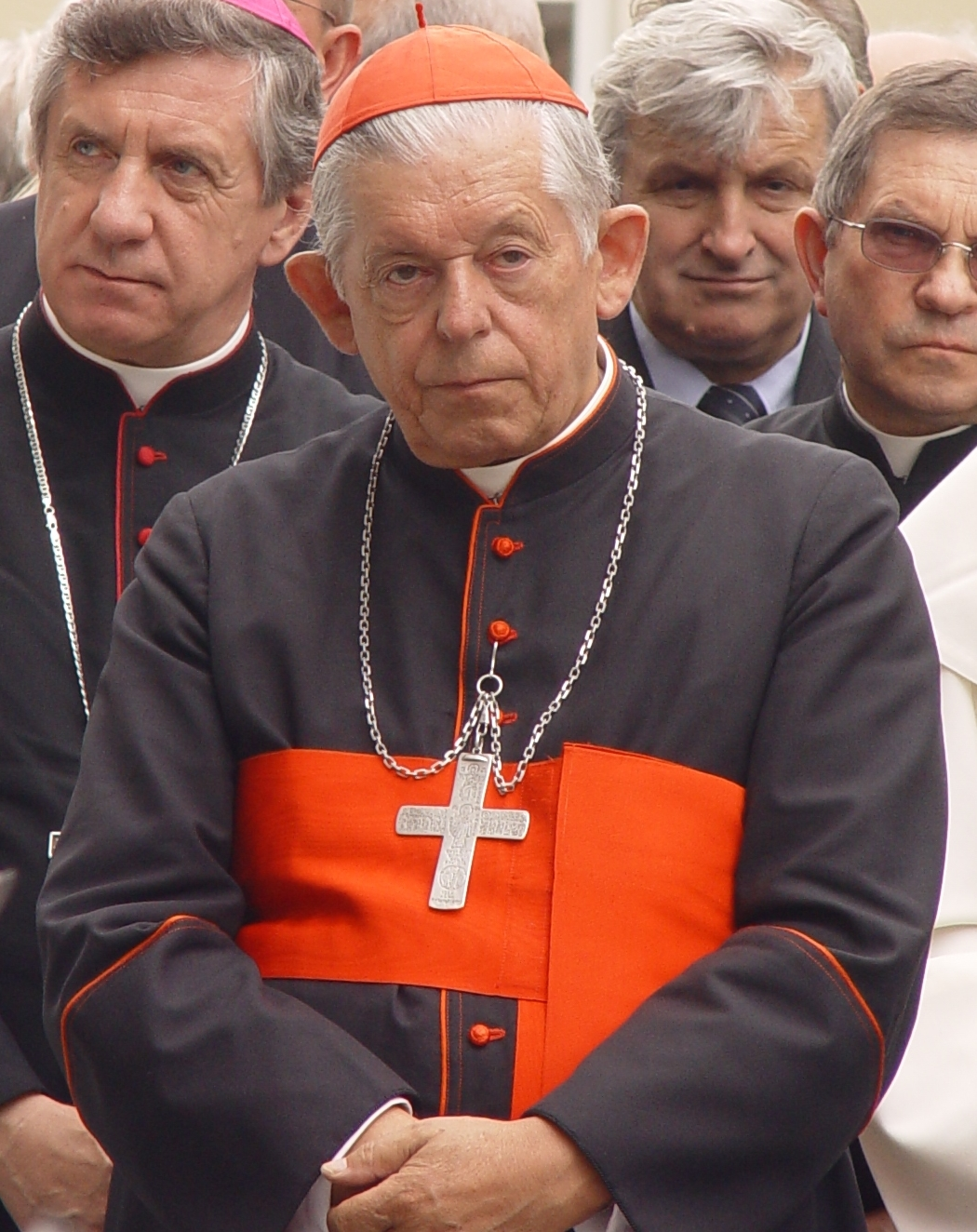
- Glemp in 2008
- Archdiocese: Warsaw
- Appointed: 7 July 1981
- Installed: 25 September 1981
- Term ended: 6 December 2006
- Predecessor: Stefan Wyszyński
- Successor: Stanisław Wielgus
- Other post: Cardinal-Priest of Santa Maria in Trastevere
- Previous posts: Bishop of Warmia (1979–1981); Archbishop of Gniezno (1981–1992); Ordinary of the Ordinariate for the Faithful of the Eastern Rites in Poland (1981–2007); Apostolic Administrator of Warsaw (2007)

Orders
- Ordination: 25 May 1956
- Consecration: 21 April 1979 by Stefan Wyszyński
- Created cardinal: 2 February 1983 by John Paul II
- Rank: Cardinal-Priest

Personal details
- Born: 18 December 1929 Inowrocław, Poznań Voivodeship, Poland
- Died: 23 January 2013 (aged 83) Warsaw, Masovian Voivodeship, Poland
- Denomination: Catholic
- Motto: Caritati in iustitia; (Love in justice)
- Coat of arms

Józef Glemp (18 December 1929 – 23 January 2013) was a Polish cardinal of the Catholic Church. He was Archbishop of Warsaw from 1981 to 2006, and was elevated to the cardinalate in 1983. He assumed the title of Primate of Poland following Stefan Wyszyński's death.

== Biography ==
=== Early life and ordination ===
Józef Glemp was born in Inowrocław on 18 December 1929 as a son of Kazimierz Glemp and Salomea Kośmicka, and was baptized the same day. His father had participated in the Greater Poland Uprising from 1918 to 1919. Józef studied at the seminaries of Gniezno and Poznań, but his education was interrupted by the World War II; he and his siblings were slave laborers during the Nazi occupation of Poland. Glemp was ordained to the priesthood on 25 May 1956 by Bishop Franciszek Jedwabski. Glemp was of German descent on his father's side. On a visit to Scotland, he claimed Scottish descent on his mother's side.

=== Early service ===
Between 1956 and 1959, Glemp was involved in the education of incurable youth and children in Mielżyn and Witkowo. He also taught religion classes in Wągrowiec, Miasteczko Krajeńskie, and Polska Wieś.

After two years of pastoral service in Poznań, Glemp was sent to Rome in 1958 to study canon law at the Pontifical Lateran University, earning his doctorate in utroque iure in 1964, with a thesis on: De evolutione conceptus fictionis iuris. After his practicum he was given the title of Advocate of the Roman Rota. He attended a course in stylistic Latin at the Pontifical Gregorian University and also finished his studies in ecclesial administration.

=== Chaplain ===
In 1964, Glemp completed all of his studies in Rome and returned to Gniezno in Poland. He became chaplain of the Dominican and Franciscan Sisters and teacher of religion in the house for delinquent minors. He worked as Secretary of the Seminary of Gniezno and as notary for the Curia and the metropolitan tribunal and also as defender of the bond.

=== Secretariat of the Primate ===
In December 1967, he worked in the Secretariat of the Primate, and for 15 years was one of Cardinal Stefan Wyszyński's close collaborators. As the personal chaplain of the Cardinal, he accompanied him on his journeys within Poland and to Rome. He exercised varied responsibilities in the Commissions of the Polish Episcopate and taught Canon Law at the Academy of the Catholic Theology in Warsaw. He participated in several congresses on this topic in Poland and abroad. In 1972 he was named a Chaplain of His Holiness, and in March 1976 he became Canon of the Metropolitan Chapter at Gniezno.

=== Bishop ===
Styles of Józef Glemp
- Reference style: His Eminence
- Spoken style: Your Eminence
- Informal style: Cardinal
- See: Warsaw (emeritus)

On 4 March 1979, John Paul II named Glemp Bishop of Warmia, in the northeast part of Poland and he was consecrated on 21 April, in Gniezno. After the death of Cardinal Wyszyński on 18 May 1981, he was named Archbishop of Gniezno on 7 July 1981, in union "pro hac vice, ad personam" with the Archdiocese of Warsaw. As Bishop of Gniezno he became also the Primate of Poland. (Note: The title of Primate of Poland was conferred on the Archbishop of Gniezno by Pope Martin V in 1418 and confirmed by Leo X in 1515. The Primate of Poland, even if he is not a cardinal, has the right to wear the red "zucchetto" of a cardinal. This privilege was accorded as early as 1600 and confirmed by Benedict XIV in 1749.)

=== Cardinal ===
Glemp was created Cardinal-Priest by John Paul II in the consistory of 2 February 1983 and assigned the titular church of Church of St. Mary in Trastevere. On 25 March 1992, with the restructuring of the Church dioceses in Poland, John Paul II dissolved the union "ad personam" of Gniezno-Warsaw, naming as Metropolitan Archbishop of Gniezno Bishop Henryk Muszynski. The Pope decided that the title of Primate of Poland should remain linked to the historical heritage of S. Adalberto in the Archdiocese of Gniezno and confirmed that Cardinal Józef Glemp, Archbishop of Warsaw, who had custody of the relics of S. Adalberto, which were venerated in the Cathedral of Gniezno, should continue to bear the title of Primate of Poland. Pope Benedict XVI stipulated that Cardinal Glemp, despite his retirement, would remain primate until 18 December 2009, his 80th birthday.

Cardinal Glemp was engaged in legal difficulties involving several prominent American Jews. In 1989, Alan Dershowitz filed a defamation suit against Glemp on behalf of Rabbi Avi Weiss. That summer, Weiss and six other American Jews from New York had staged a protest at the Auschwitz concentration camp in Poland, over the presence of a convent of Polish Carmelite nuns, on the site where around 74,000 Polish Catholics were killed. Weiss and the protesters were ejected after attempting to illegally scale a wall surrounding the convent. In an August 1989 speech, Glemp referenced the incident and ascribed a violent intent to the protesters, saying, "Recently, a squad of seven Jews from New York launched an attack on the convent at Oswiecim [Auschwitz]. They did not kill the nuns or destroy the convent only because they were stopped." In the same speech, Glemp criticised the presentation of this in the American media, claiming Jewish bias and ascribing this to alleged Jewish news media ownership in the United States. Dershowitz's suit centered on these statements. Dershowitz's account of the lawsuit appears in his 1991 book Chutzpah.

=== Episcopal conference ===
Cardinal Glemp acted as President of the Episcopal Conference of Poland for 23 years, from 1981 until March 2004.

He was president delegate to the 1st Special Assembly for Europe of the Synod of Bishops (1991).

Glemp was one of the cardinal electors who participated in the 2005 papal conclave that selected Pope Benedict XVI.

=== Apostolic administrator ===
On 7 January 2007, it was announced that Cardinal Glemp would be acting as the Apostolic Administrator of the Archdiocese of Warsaw due to the resignation of Stanisław Wielgus. On 3 March 2007, Kazimierz Nycz was appointed to the Warsaw see.

=== Death ===
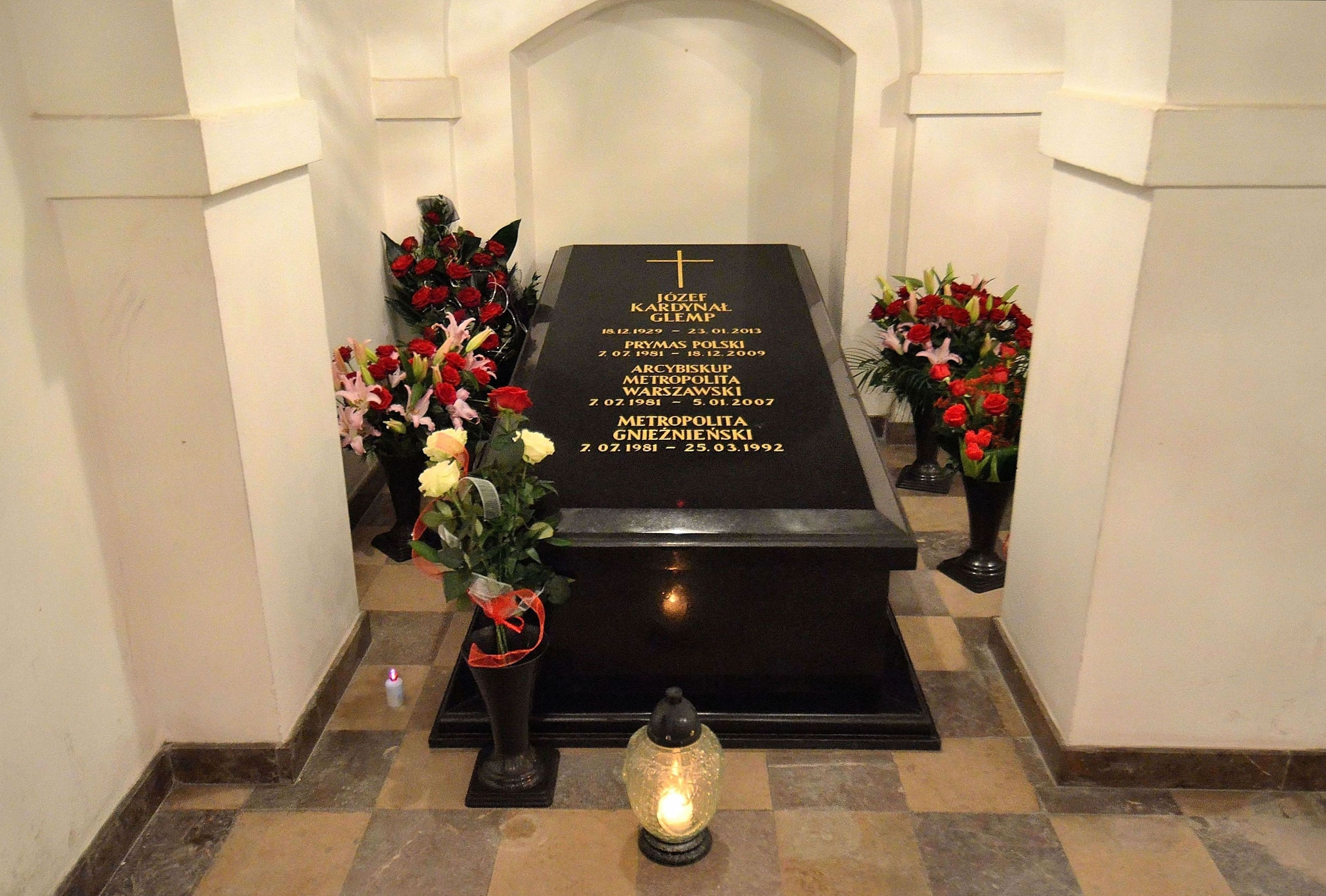
Tomb of Józef Glemp in St. John's Cathedral in Warsaw

Glemp died from lung cancer on 23 January 2013 in Warsaw at the age of 83. Funeral celebrations lasted three days, from 26 to 28 January 2013, and took place in three major churches of Warsaw. On Saturday, 26 January, the cardinal's body was lying in state in the Visitationist Church. On Sunday, the coffin was moved to the Church of the Holy Cross, where a Holy Mass was celebrated by Archbishop Celestino Migliore, the apostolic nuncio to Poland, with the sermon preached by Archbishop Józef Michalik, the head of the Polish Conference of Bishops. After the mass, a funeral procession took the coffin to St. John's Cathedral. The Monday, 28 January 2013 Funeral Mass was attended by president Bronisław Komorowski and his wife Anna, former president Lech Wałęsa, former prime minister Tadeusz Mazowiecki, representatives from the judiciary, the Senate, and the Sejm, and other high-ranking officials from various institutions. Over a hundred prelates from Poland and abroad (among them, Prague's Cardinal Dominik Duka, Budapest's Cardinal Peter Erdo, Barcelona's Cardinal Lluis Martinez Sistach, Cologne's Cardinal Joachim Meisner, and Zagreb's Cardinal Josip Bozanić) concelebrated, with Cardinal Stanisław Dziwisz, the Archbishop of Kraków, presiding. The homily was given by the Archbishop of Gniezno, Józef Kowalczyk, the incumbent Primate of Poland. Afterwards, the late primate was entombed in a crypt of the cathedral.

=== Curial membership ===
- Oriental Churches (congregation)
- Culture (council)
- Apostolic Signatura (tribunal)

== Views ==
=== Radio Maryja ===
Primate Józef Glemp said in 2005 that the Catholic Radio Maryja was causing a rift in the Church.

=== Wielgus affair ===
During the controversy surrounding the alleged collaboration of bishop Stanislaw Wielgus with the communist secret services, Cardinal Glemp said that the prelate was a true servant of God and that media accusations against him were unfounded or exaggerated.

=== 1989 alcohol sermon ===
Glemp gave a homily in 1989 for which he faced criticism for years afterwards. In it, he suggested that Jews had spread alcoholism in Poland, and talked of Jewish control of the media. In 1991, Glemp wrote a letter to an American archbishop in which he expressed regret for the sermon, and said he recognized that it might have caused pain among Jews. During his visit to the United States later that year, Glemp met with a dozen Jewish leaders inside the residence of cardinal John O'Connor in New York while about 100 protestors demonstrated outside. In that meeting, Glemp and the Jewish leaders set up a program in which Jewish scholars would go to Poland and teach about the contributions and history of Jews in Poland.

== Notes ==
Catholic Church titles
Preceded by Józef Drzazga	Bishop of Warmia; 1979–1981	Succeeded by Jan Władysław Obłąk
Preceded by Stefan Wyszyński	Archbishop of Gniezno; 1981–1992	Succeeded by Henryk Muszyński
Preceded by Stefan Wyszyński	Archbishop of Warsaw; 1981–2006	Succeeded by Stanisław Wielgus
Preceded by ---	Archbishop of Warsaw (apostolic administrator); 7 January 2007 – 3 March 2007	Succeeded by Kazimierz Nycz
Preceded by Stefan Wyszyński	Primate of Poland; 1981–2009	Succeeded by Henryk Muszyński
Preceded by --	Great Prior Order of the Holy Sepulchre in Poland; 1996–2013	Succeeded by Andrzej Dziuba
