= Królewiec, Greater Poland Voivodeship =

Królewiec
- Village
- Location within Poland
- Coordinates: 52°22′49″N 17°41′03″E
- Country: Poland
- Voivodeship: Greater Poland
- County: Gniezno
- Gmina: Witkowo

Królewiec (Polish pronunciation: [kruˈlɛvjɛts]) is a village in the administrative district of Gmina Witkowo, within Gniezno County, Greater Poland Voivodeship, in west-central Poland.
