= Malenin, Greater Poland Voivodeship =

Malenin
- Village
- Location within Poland
- Coordinates: 52°25′N 17°44′E
- Country: Poland
- Voivodeship: Greater Poland
- County: Gniezno
- Gmina: Witkowo
- Time zone: UTC+1 (CET)
  - Summer (DST): UTC+2 (CEST)

Malenin [maˈlɛnin] is a village in the administrative district of Gmina Witkowo, within Gniezno County, Greater Poland Voivodeship, in west-central Poland.

Malenin was a private church village within the Polish Crown, administratively located in the Kalisz Voivodeship in the Greater Poland Province of the Polish Crown.

During the German occupation of Poland (World War II), in 1940, Germans expelled Polish inhabitants of Malenin to the General Government, and their farms were then handed over to German colonists as part of the Lebensraum policy.
