= Skorzęcin =

- Village
- Location within Poland
- Coordinates: 52°27′52″N 17°51′22″E
- Country: Poland
- Voivodeship: Greater Poland Voivodeship
- County: Gniezno
- Gmina: Witkowo

Skorzęcin [skɔˈʐɛɲt͡ɕin] is a village in the administrative district of Gmina Witkowo, within Gniezno County, Greater Poland Voivodeship, in west-central Poland.
