= Gorzykowo =

- Village
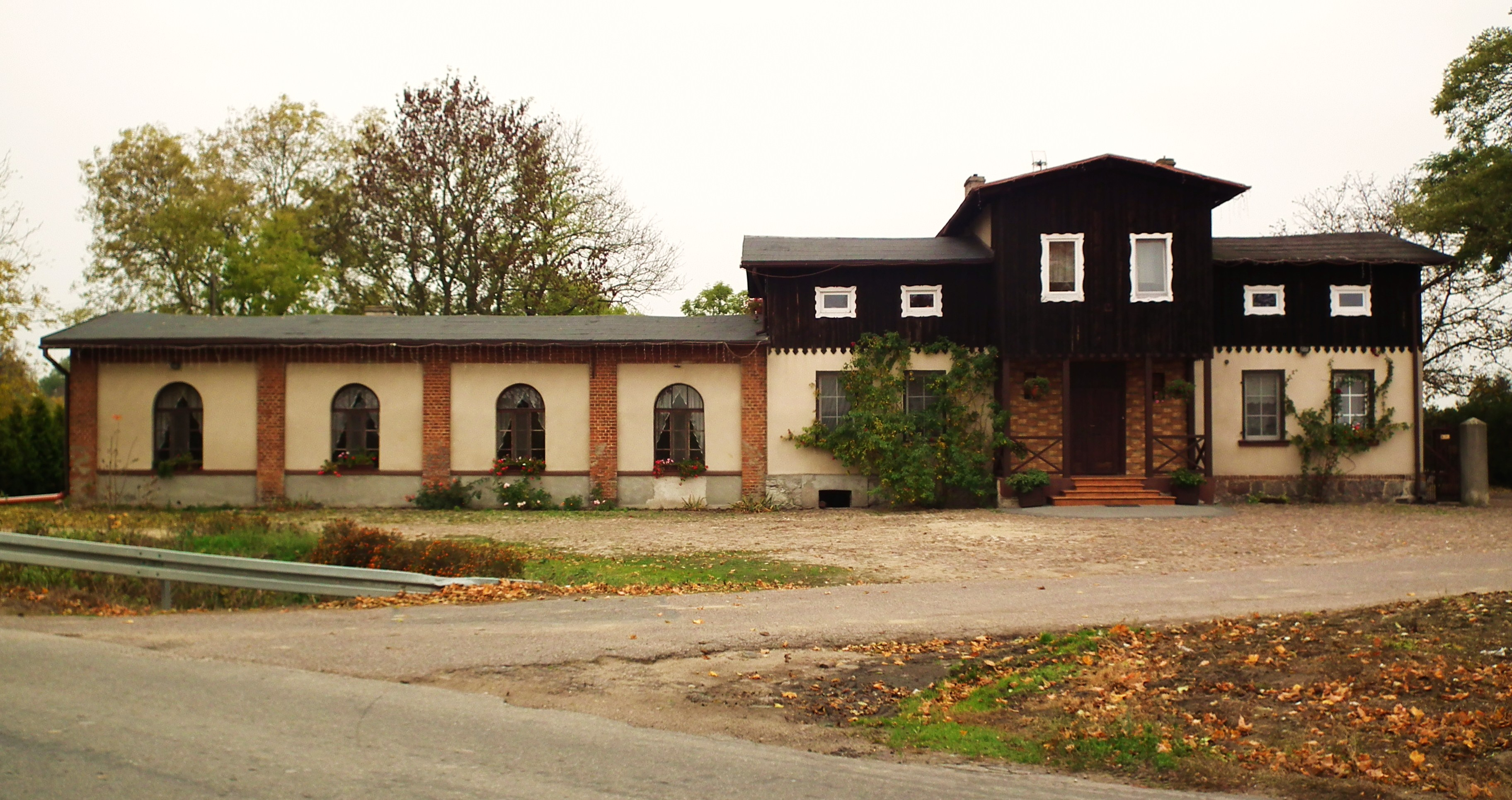
- Train station

- Location within Poland
- Coordinates: 52°24′N 17°43′E
- Country: Poland
- Voivodeship: Greater Poland
- County: Gniezno
- Gmina: Witkowo

Gorzykowo [ɡɔʐɨˈkɔvɔ] is a village in the administrative district of Gmina Witkowo, within Gniezno County, Greater Poland Voivodeship, in west-central Poland.
