= Ruchocinek =

- Village
- Location within Poland
- Coordinates: 52°25′N 17°50′E
- Country: Poland
- Voivodeship: Greater Poland
- County: Gniezno
- Gmina: Witkowo
- Population: 380

Ruchocinek [ruxɔˈt͡ɕinɛk] is a village in the administrative district of Gmina Witkowo, within Gniezno County, Greater Poland Voivodeship, in west-central Poland.
