= Małachowo-Kępe =

- Village
- Location in Poland
- Coordinates: 52°25′58″N 17°43′30″E
- Country: Poland
- Voivodeship: Greater Poland
- County: Gniezno
- Gmina: Witkowo

Population (2021)
  - Total: 98
- Time zone: UTC+1 (CET)
  - Summer (DST): UTC+2 (CEST)
- Vehicle registration: PGN

Małachowo-Kępe ([mawaˈxɔvɔ ˈkɛmpɛ]) is a village in the administrative district of Gmina Witkowo, within Gniezno County, Greater Poland Voivodeship, in west-central Poland.

== Geography ==
The locality is recorded in Poland’s State Register of Geographical Names (PRNG) as a village in the rural area of Gmina Witkowo, Gniezno County, Greater Poland Voivodeship.

== Demographics ==
According to population statistics compiled from official Polish data, the village had 98 inhabitants in 2021.

== History ==
Małachowo-Kępe, historically also known as Małachowo-Kępice, was a private village of Polish nobility, administratively located in the Gniezno County in the Kalisz Voivodeship in the Greater Poland Province of the Polish Crown.

During the German occupation of Poland (World War II), in 1940, the Germans expelled several Polish inhabitants to the General Government, and their farms were then handed over to German colonists as part of the Lebensraum policy.

== Transport ==
Vehicles registered in Gniezno County use the distinguishing mark GN under the Greater Poland Voivodeship prefix (commonly rendered as PGN) in the official register of plate codes.
