= Jaworowo, Gniezno County =

Jaworowo
- Village
- Location within Poland
- Coordinates: 52°23′08″N 17°43′34″E
- Country: Poland
- Voivodeship: Greater Poland
- County: Gniezno
- Gmina: Witkowo

Jaworowo [javɔˈrɔvɔ] is a village in the administrative district of Gmina Witkowo, within Gniezno County, Greater Poland Voivodeship, in west-central Poland.
