= Roman Catholic Archdiocese of Warmia =

Catholic archdiocese in Poland

Coordinates: 53.7761°N 20.4775°E

Archdiocese of Warmia Archidioecesis Varmiensis Archidiecezja warmińska

Catholic
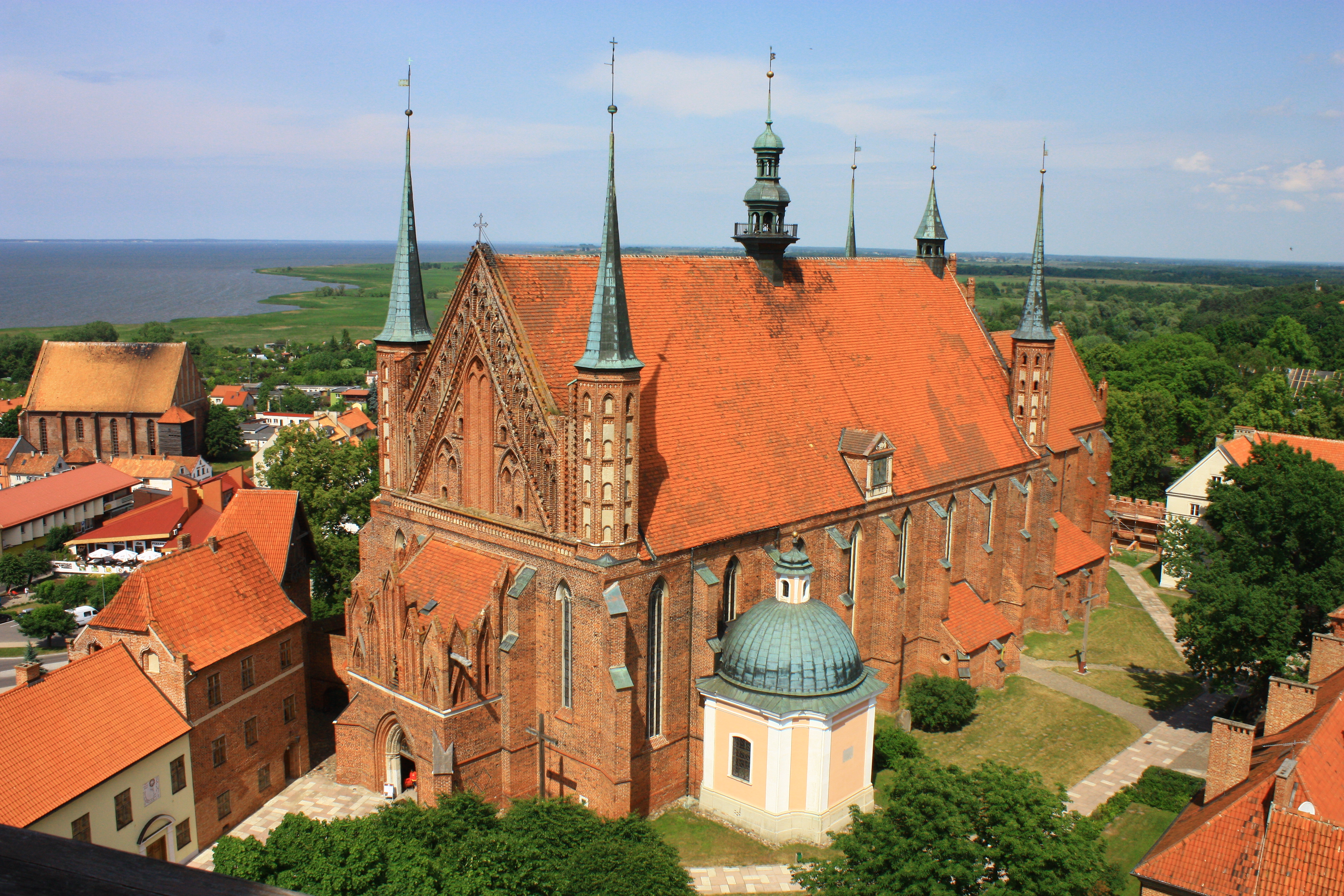
- Frombork Cathedral, with Vistula Lagoon in background.

- Coat of arms

Location
- Country: Poland
- Ecclesiastical province: Province of Warmia

Statistics
- Area: 12,000 km^{2} (4,600 sq mi)
- Population: Total; Catholics: (as of 2020); 705,480; 689,300 (97.7%)

Information
- Denomination: Catholic
- Rite: Latin Rite
- Established: 13th Century (As Diocese of Warmia); 25 March 1992 (As Archdiocese of Warmia)
- Cathedral: Basilica of the Assumption of the Blessed Virgin Mary in Frombork
- Co-cathedral: Basilica of Saint James the Apostle in Olsztyn

Current leadership
- Pope: Leo XIV
- Metropolitan Archbishop: Józef Górzyński, Archbishop of Warmia
- Auxiliary Bishops: Janusz Ostrowski

Map

Website
- archidiecezjawarminska.pl

The Archdiocese of Warmia (Polish: Archidiecezja warmińska, German: Erzdiözese Ermland) is a Latin Church Metropolitan archdiocese of the Catholic Church in the Warmian-Masurian Voivodeship, Poland.

The archbishop has his Cathedral archiepiscopal see: Bazylika Archikatedralna Wniebowzięcia NMP i św. Andrzeja Apostoła, in the town of Frombork, and a Co-Cathedral Basilica of St. James in Olsztyn. Both are minor basilicas, and the archdiocese has six more : Bazylika Najświętszego Zbawiciela i Wszystkich Świętych, in Dobre Miasto; Bazylika Narodzenia NMP, in Gietrzwałd; Bazylika Nawiedzenia NMP, in Matki Jedności; Bazylika Sanktuarium Matki Pokoju, in Stoczek Klasztorny; Bazylika św. Jerzego, in Kętrzyn and Bazylika św. Katarzyny, in Braniewo.

The Archcathedral Basilica of the Assumption of the Blessed Virgin Mary and St. Andrew in Frombork is listed as a Historic Monument of Poland.

The current archbishop is Józef Górzyński, who was appointed by Pope Francis in 2016.

== History ==
Founded as a diocese in the region of Warmia on 29 July 1243, it was one of the four bishoprics of the State of the Teutonic Order in Prussia. The first bishop Heinrich von Strateich never actually took his office. His successor Anselm of Meissen, officiating between 1250 and 1274, became the first bishop active in Warmia. In 1253, after Albert Suerbeer finally achieved his long disputed investiture with the newly elevated Archbishopric of Riga, Warmia - like a number of other Baltic dioceses - became Riga's suffragan. Warmia's first bishops were appointed by Polish and Teutonic Knights' officials and were mostly Germans, however, unlike the other Prussian bishoprics (Culm (Chełmno), Pomesania, and Samland (Sambia)), Warmia's diocesan chapter, established in 1260, maintained independence. Its members were not simultaneously members of the Teutonic Order, as was the case in the other Prussian chapters since the 1280s. Thus the chapter could repel influencing by outside powers.

In 1356 the Golden Bull of Emperor Charles IV designated the bishop as Prince-Bishop of Warmia, a rank not awarded to the other Prussian bishops with their dependent chapters. By the double function of prince-bishops they officiated as spiritual leader in the diocese and as secular prince in the Prince-Bishopric of Warmia, a semi-independent state comprising about a third of the actual diocesan territory, first as part of Teutonic Prussia.

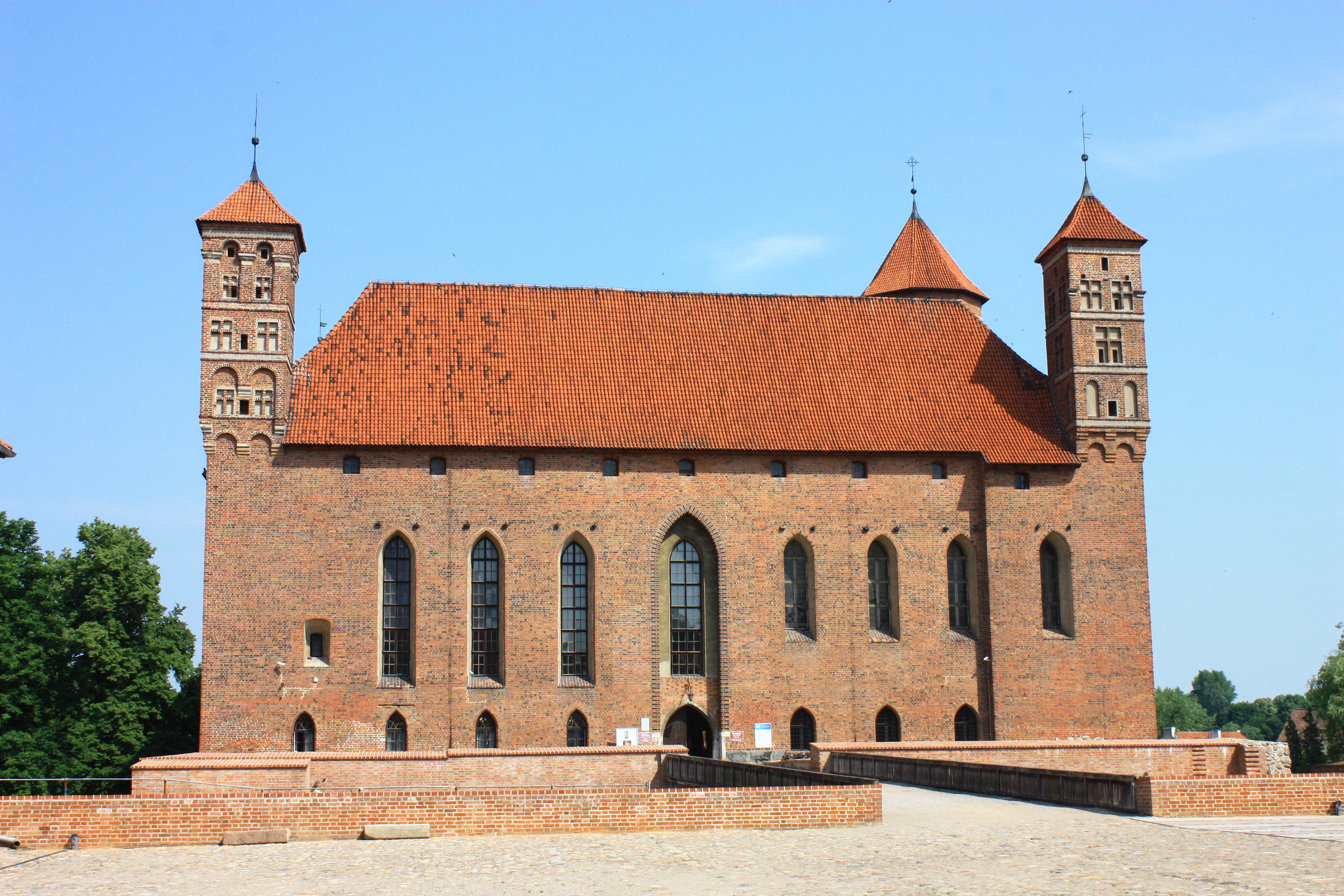
Lidzbark Castle, former seat of the Prince-Bishops of Warmia

In February 1440 the nobility of Warmia and the town of Braniewo co-founded the Prussian Confederation, which opposed Teutonic rule, and most towns of Warmia joined the organization in May 1440. In February 1454, the organization asked Polish King Casimir IV Jagiellon to incorporate the region to the Kingdom of Poland, to which the king agreed and signed the act of incorporation in Kraków on 6 March 1454, and the Thirteen Years' War (1454–1466) broke out. During the war Warmia was partly recaptured by the Teutonic Knights, however, in 1464 Bishop Paweł Legendorf vel Mgowski sided with Poland and the Prince-Bishopric came again under the overlordship of the Polish King. In the peace treaty of 1466 the Teutonic Knights renounced any claims to the prince-bishopric, and recognized it as part of Poland. It administratively remained a prince-bishopric with several privileges, part of the larger provinces of Royal Prussia and Greater Poland Province. When King Casimir IV attempted to reduce the prince-episcopal autonomy this caused the War of the Priests.

Prince-Bishop Lucas Watzenrode, officiating between 1489 and 1512, aimed at Warmia's exemption from Riga in order to establish a Warmian metropolis, comprising the dioceses within Teutonic Prussia, part of Poland as a fief since 1466, as suffragans. The plans failed, but Watzenrode reclaimed the exemption after ca. 1492. In the Second Treaty of Piotrków Trybunalski (December 7, 1512) Warmia conceded to King Alexander Jagiellon a limited right to propose four candidates to the chapter for the election, who however had to be residents of the province of Royal Prussia.

Under Watzenrode's successors changing suffraganship from Riga to Gniezno did not materialise. The diocese de jure remained a suffragan of Riga until its dissolution in 1566. Thereafter Warmia was an exempt diocese.

In 1569, Warmia was united more directly with the Kingdom of Poland within the Polish–Lithuanian Commonwealth. In this period the chapter mostly elected bishops of Polish nationality. The faithful in the northern part of the diocese were by large majority ethnic Germans, while in the south the large majority were ethnic Poles. Following King Sigismund III's Prussian regency contract (1605) with Joachim Frederick of Brandenburg, and his Prussian enfeoffment contract (1611) with John Sigismund of Brandenburg these two rulers guaranteed free practice of Catholic religion in all of prevailingly Lutheran Ducal Prussia, a vassal duchy of Poland. In practice, however, the ducal government obstructed Catholic exercise in many ways.

But based on these contracts the prince-bishops gradually extended their de facto competence beyond the territory of their proper prince-bishopric of secular rule. As a result, the see regained jurisdiction in the two thirds of its diocesan territory outside its secular prince-bishopric and beyond into the diocesan areas of the dissolved former neighbour dioceses such as Sambia and Pomesania, and Warmia became the diocese competent for all of Ducal Prussia. This development was recognised by the Holy See in 1617 by de jure extending Warmia's jurisdiction over Sambia's former diocesan territory. After the First Partition of Poland in 1772, Warmia was annexed by the Kingdom of Prussia, forming part of its newly formed province of East Prussia in the following year.

By the bull De salute animum (July 16, 1820) the Catholic Church in Prussia was reorganised. However, the diocesan territory was not adapted to the new provincial borders established in 1815. Since most inhabitants of East Prussia had become Lutherans, the diocesan territories of the former bishoprics of Pomesania (partially) and Samland with its few remaining Catholics were part of the Diocese of Ermland (Warmia), thus territorially comprising all of the Prussian province of East Prussia except the southwestern corner (main part of Pomesania diocese around Marienwerder (Kwidzyn), which had become the Deanery of Pomesania within Culm (Chełmno) diocese). In 1901, the total population in the area of the diocese was about 2,000,000, among them 327,567 Catholics.

On 28 October 1925 the Holy See - by the Bull Vixdum Poloniae unitas - seceded the Pomesania deanery from the Diocese of Chełmno and assigned it to Ermland, while Memelland was dissected from the diocese, so that it territorially comprised all the Prussian province of East Prussia in its altered borders of 1922. In 1930 the diocesan exemption ended and Ermland, then led by Bishop Maximilian Kaller, became part of the Eastern German Ecclesiastical Province under the newly elevated Archdiocese of Breslau (Wrocław).

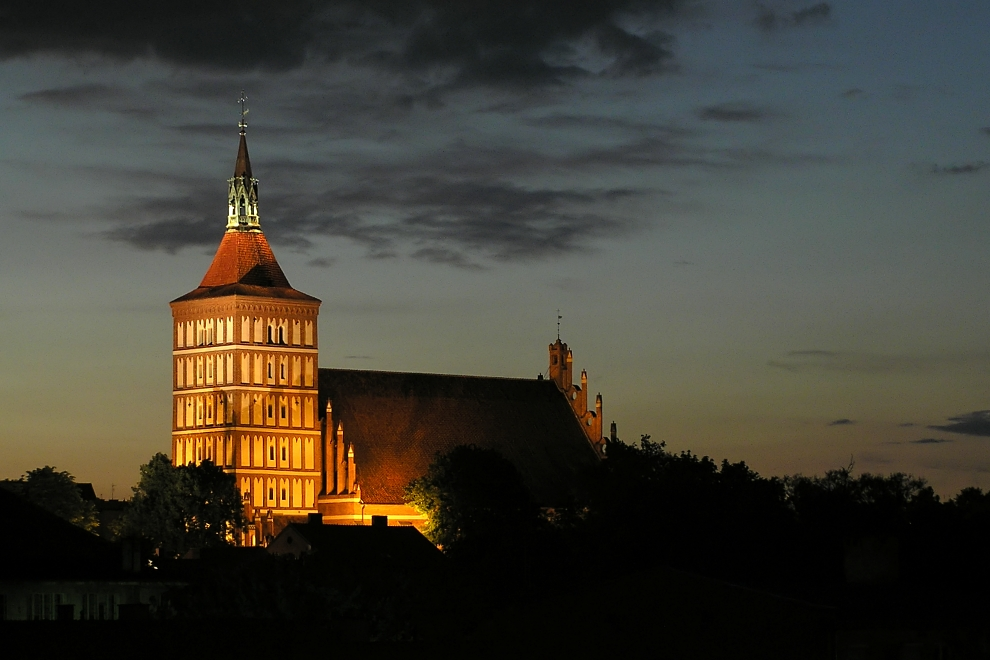
Olsztyn Co-Cathedral

Following the defeat of Germany in World War II, Warmia became again part of Poland, although with a Soviet-installed communist regime, which stayed in power until the Fall of Communism in the 1980s. Bishop Kaller resigned from jurisdiction in the Polish-held diocesan area, retaining the title bishop, and was expelled by communist authorities in mid-August 1945. Pope Pius XII then appointed him the "Bishop of the Expellees". The diocese was then claimed by the Polish Catholic Church, supported by the communist state. August Hlond had appointed Teodor Bensch as Apostolic Administrator superseding the still existing capitular canons, who otherwise could have elected a new bishop candidate. The Holy See, however, regarded the post-war territorial changes not yet contractually confirmed. So the see with its traditional cathedral in Frombork remained vacant after Kaller's death.

In 1972 - in response to West Germany's change in Ostpolitik with the Treaty of Warsaw - the Holy See re-established a new Polish Diocese appointing Józef Drzazga, who was then a suffragan to the Archdiocese of Warsaw. Drzazga relocated the actual see to Olsztyn.

On 25 March 1992 Warmia was elevated to a metropolitan archdiocese and given two new suffragans, the Diocese of Ełk and the Diocese of Elbląg. The Diocese of Ełk comprised territory taken from the dioceses of Warmia and Łomża. The Diocese of Elbląg comprised territory taken from Warmia and the former dioceses of Chełmno (now Diocese of Pelplin) and Gdańsk (now Archdiocese of Gdańsk).

Only in 1991 was it possible to celebrate Roman Catholic services in German again. At first, they were held in the Church of Mary the Virgin and Mother of God in Allenstein-Jomendorf.

Today the see comprises an area of 12,000 km^{2} with 694,000 Catholics, 33 deans, 260 church districts, 422 diocesan priests, 124 priests in religious orders, and 244 nuns.

== Ordinaries ==
The following is a list of the bishops and archbishops since the episcopal see was re-established in 1972. For earlier bishops and prince-bishops, see List of bishops of Warmia.

TO ELABORATE

Suffragan Bishops of Warmia
Period of office	Incumbent	Notes
1972 to 1978	Józef Drzazga	Formerly an Auxiliary Bishop of Warmia (1967–1972); appointed Diocesan Bishop of Warmia 28 June 1972; died in office 12 September 1978
1979 to 1981	Józef Glemp	Appointed Diocesan Bishop of Warmia 4 March 1979 and ordained bishop 21 April 1979; appointed to the archdiocese of Gniezno 7 July 1981
1982 to 1988	Jan Władysław Obłąk	Formerly an Auxiliary Bishop of Warmia (1967–1982); appointed Diocesan Bishop of Warmia 13 April 1982; retired in 1988; died 16 December 1988
1988 to 1992	Edmund Michał Piszcz	Formerly Apostolic Administrator of Warmia (1985–1988); appointed Diocesan Bishop of Warmia 22 October 1988; appointed Archbishop of Warmia 25 March 1992

Archbishops of Warmia
Period of office	Incumbent	Notes
1992 to 2006	Edmund Michał Piszcz	Hitherto Bishop of Warmia; appointed Archbishop of Warmia 25 March 1992; retired 30 May 2006
2006 to 2016	Wojciech Ziemba	Formerly Archbishop of Białystok (2000–2006); appointed Archbishop of Warmia 30 May 2006 and installed 11 June 2006; retired 15 October 2016; died 21 April 2021
since 2016	Józef Górzyński	Formerly an Auxiliary Bishop of Warsaw (2013–2015); coadjutor Archbishop of Warmia (2015-2016); succeeded Archbishop of Warmia and installed 15 October 2016

== See also ==
- List of Roman Catholic dioceses in Poland
- Duchy of Warmia

== Sources and external links ==
- Official Website
- GCatholic, with Google map
- Archdiocese of Warmia at Catholic-Hierarchy
- Memorial website, listing names of the dead
