= Małachowo-Wierzbiczany =

- Village
- Location within Poland
- Coordinates: 52°26′06″N 17°44′47″E
- Country: Poland
- Voivodeship: Greater Poland
- County: Gniezno
- Gmina: Witkowo
- Time zone: UTC+1 (CET)
  - Summer (DST): UTC+2 (CEST)

Małachowo-Wierzbiczany [mawaˈxɔvɔ vjɛʐbiˈt͡ʂanɨ] is a village in the administrative district of Gmina Witkowo, within Gniezno County, Greater Poland Voivodeship, in west-central Poland.

== History ==
Małachowo-Wierzbiczany, historically also known as Małachowo-Wierzbięcice, was a private village of Polish nobility, administratively located in the Gniezno County in the Kalisz Voivodeship in the Greater Poland Province of the Polish Crown.

During the German occupation of Poland (World War II), in 1940, the Germans expelled several Polish inhabitants to the General Government, and their farms were then handed over to German colonists as part of the Lebensraum policy.

== Notable people ==
- Roch Morcinek (1903–1968), Polish historian and military officer, prisoner of war of the Oflag II-C during World War II
