= Krzyżówka, Gniezno County =

Krzyżówka
- Village
- Location within Poland
- Coordinates: 52°30′N 17°46′E
- Country: Poland
- Voivodeship: Greater Poland
- County: Gniezno
- Gmina: Witkowo

Krzyżówka [kʂɨˈʐufka] is a village in the administrative district of Gmina Witkowo, within Gniezno County, Greater Poland Voivodeship, in west-central Poland.
