= Jan Władysław Obłąk =

Polish Roman Catholic bishop

- Bishop of Warmia
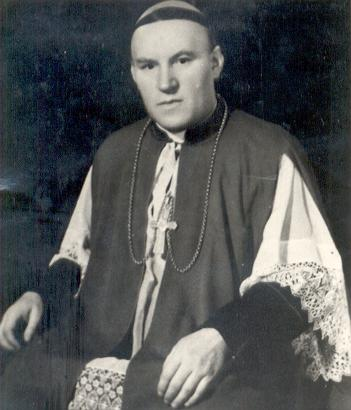
- Church: Catholic Church
- Diocese: Diocese of Warmia
- In office: 13 April 1982 – 22 October 1988
- Predecessor: Józef Glemp
- Successor: Edmund Michał Piszcz
- Previous posts: Auxiliary Bishop of Warmia (1972-1982); Titular Bishop of Abbir Maius (1961-1982); Auxiliary Bishop of Gniezno (1961-1972)

Orders
- Ordination: 29 June 1936
- Consecration: 1 April 1962 by Stefan Wyszyński

Personal details
- Born: 26 May 1913 Borzęcin, Kingdom of Galicia and Lodomeria, Cisleithania, Austria-Hungary
- Died: 16 December 1988 (aged 75) Olsztyn, Olsztyn Voivodeship, Polish People's Republic

Jan Władysław Obłąk (born 26 May 1913 in Borzęcin; died 16 December 1988) was a Polish Catholic Priest, Bishop of Warmia from 1982 until his death in 1988.

| Preceded by Józef Glemp | Bishop of Warmia; 1981–1988 | Succeeded by Edmund Michał Piszcz |
