= Kołaczkowo, Gniezno County =

Kołaczkowo
- Village
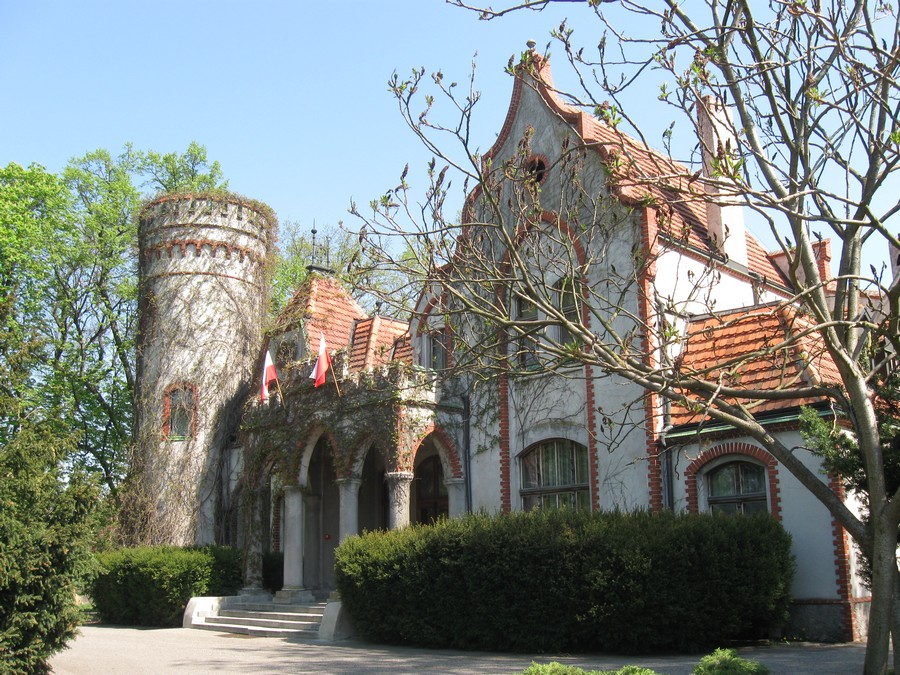
- Historic manor house in Kołaczkowo

- Location within Poland
- Coordinates: 52°27′N 17°46′E
- Country: Poland
- Voivodeship: Greater Poland
- County: Gniezno
- Gmina: Witkowo
- Time zone: UTC+1 (CET)
  - Summer (DST): UTC+2 (CEST)

Kołaczkowo [kɔwat͡ʂˈkɔvɔ] is a village in the administrative district of Gmina Witkowo, within Gniezno County, Greater Poland Voivodeship, in west-central Poland.

During the German occupation (World War II), in December 1939, the Germans expelled many Polish families from Kołaczkowo to the so-called General Government, and their houses were handed over to German colonists as part of the Heim ins Reich policy.

There is a historic manor house in Kołaczkowo with an adjacent park and an old distillery.
