= Witkowo =

Town in Greater Poland Voivodeship, Poland

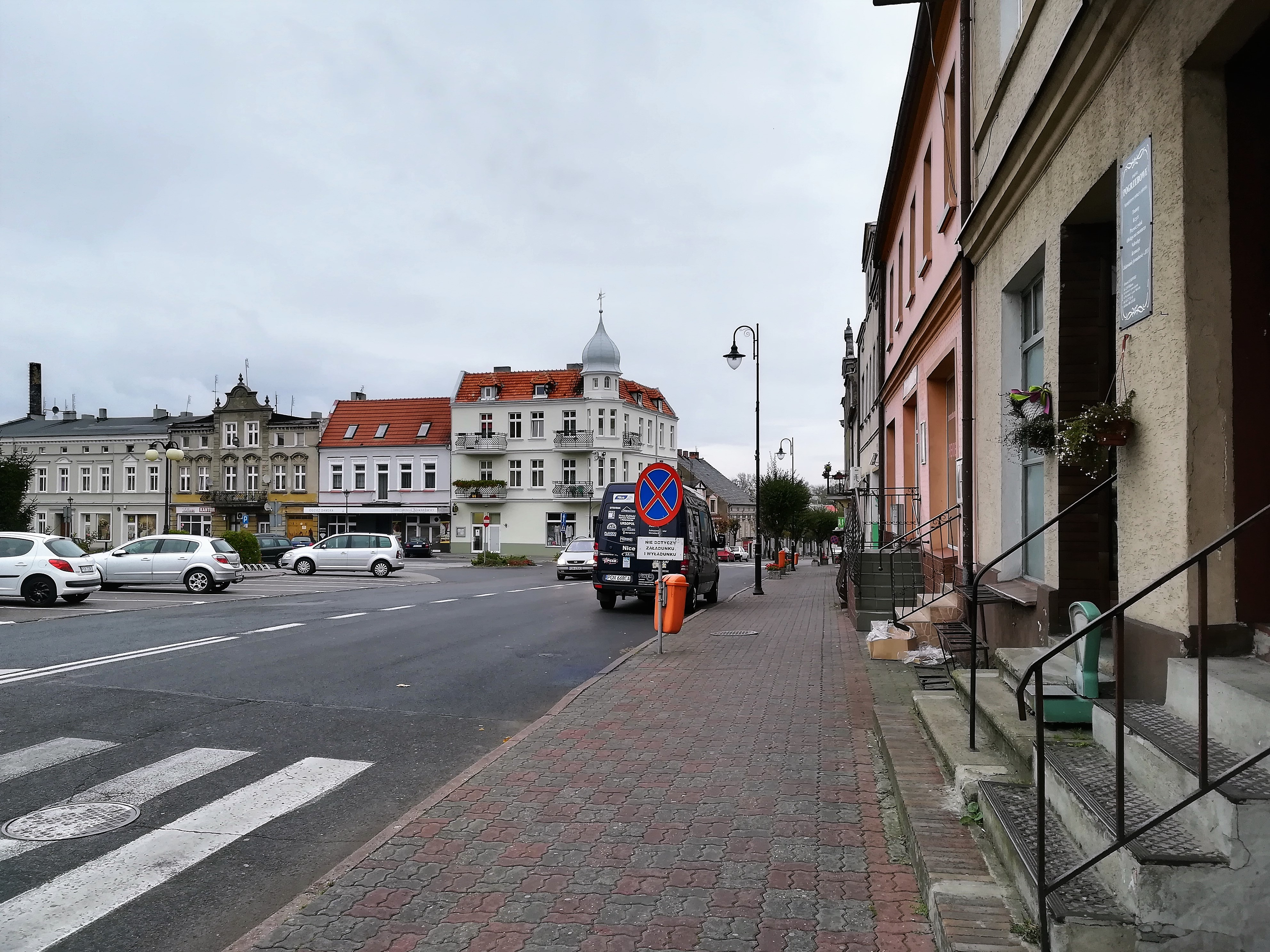
- Witkowo town center

- Flag Coat of arms

- Location within Poland
- Coordinates: 52°26′11″N 17°46′27″E
- Country: Poland
- Voivodeship: Greater Poland
- County: Gniezno
- Gmina: Witkowo
- First mentioned: 1363
- Town rights: 1676

Area
  - Total: 8.3 km^{2} (3.2 sq mi)

Population (2006)
  - Total: 7,855
  - Density: 950/km^{2} (2,500/sq mi)
- Time zone: UTC+1 (CET)
  - Summer (DST): UTC+2 (CEST)
- Postal code: 62-230
- Vehicle registration: PGN
- Climate: Dfb
- Website: http://www.witkowo.pl

Witkowo ([vitˈkɔvɔ]) is a town in Gniezno County, Greater Poland Voivodeship, in west-central Poland, located southeast of Poznań.

== History ==
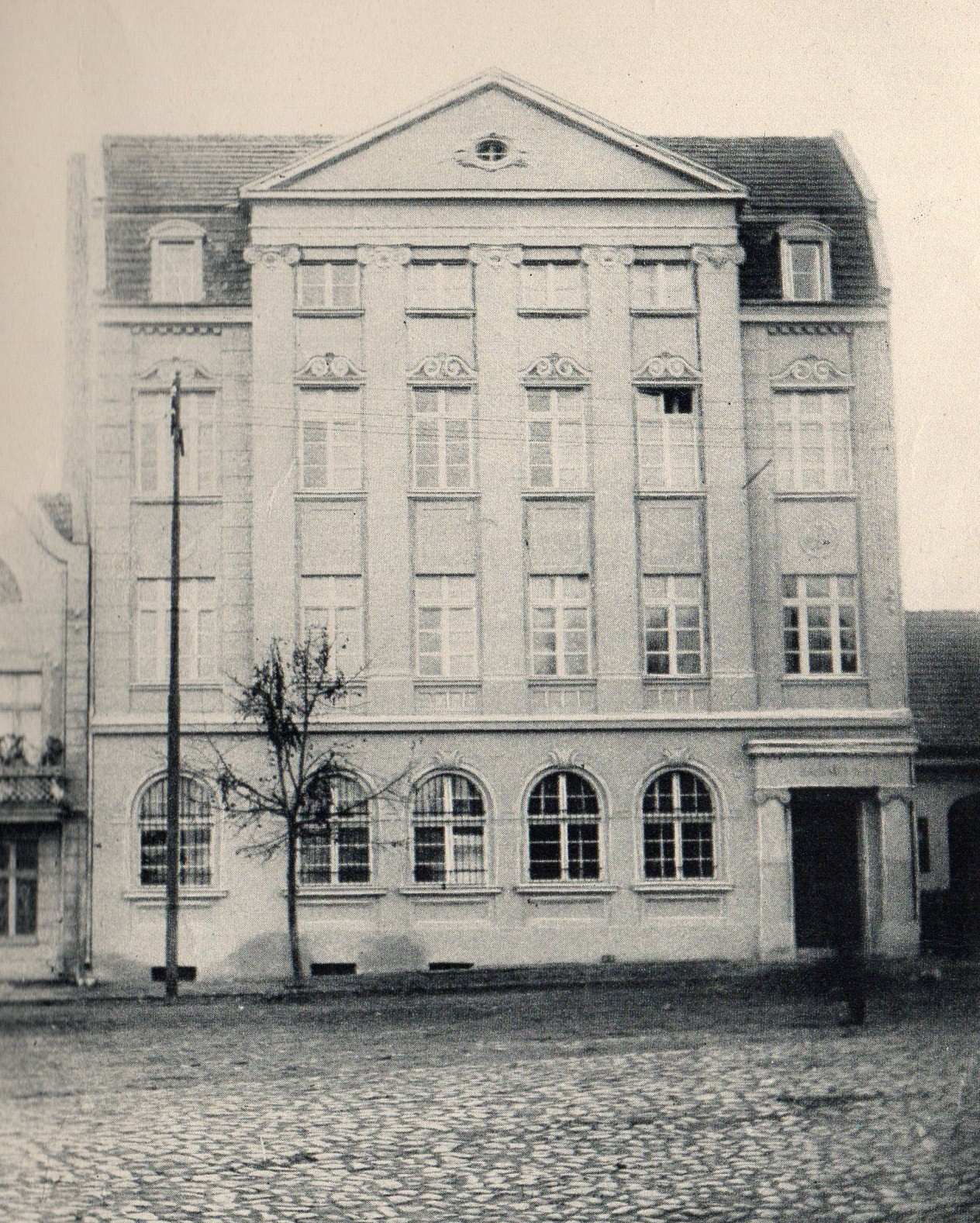
Local bank in c. 1914

Witkowo was first mentioned in a document from 1363. It was a private village of Polish nobility of the Kingdom of Poland, administratively located in the Gniezno County in the Kalisz Voivodeship in the Greater Poland Province. In 1676, it was granted town rights.

Following the joint German-Soviet invasion of Poland, which started World War II in September 1939, the town was occupied by Germany until 1945. Local units of the Grey Ranks and Wielkopolska Organizacja Wojskowa Polish resistance organizations were founded already in 1939, and the latter became part of the larger Wojskowa Organizacja Ziem Zachodnich organization in 1940. Klemens Jan Grygiel, commander of the local unit of the Grey Ranks, and Edward Paulus, founder of the local unit of the Union of Armed Struggle, were arrested by the Germans in mid-1942, and eventually sentenced to death and executed in Rawicz the following year. The local Polish police chief and another Polish policeman from Witkowo were murdered by the Russians in the Katyn massacre in 1940.

== Cuisine ==
Witkowo is one of the production sites of the Greater Poland liliput cheese (ser liliput wielkopolski), a traditional regional Polish cheese, protected as a traditional food by the Ministry of Agriculture and Rural Development of Poland.
