= Józef Drzazga =

Polish Catholic bishop

- Bishop of Warmia
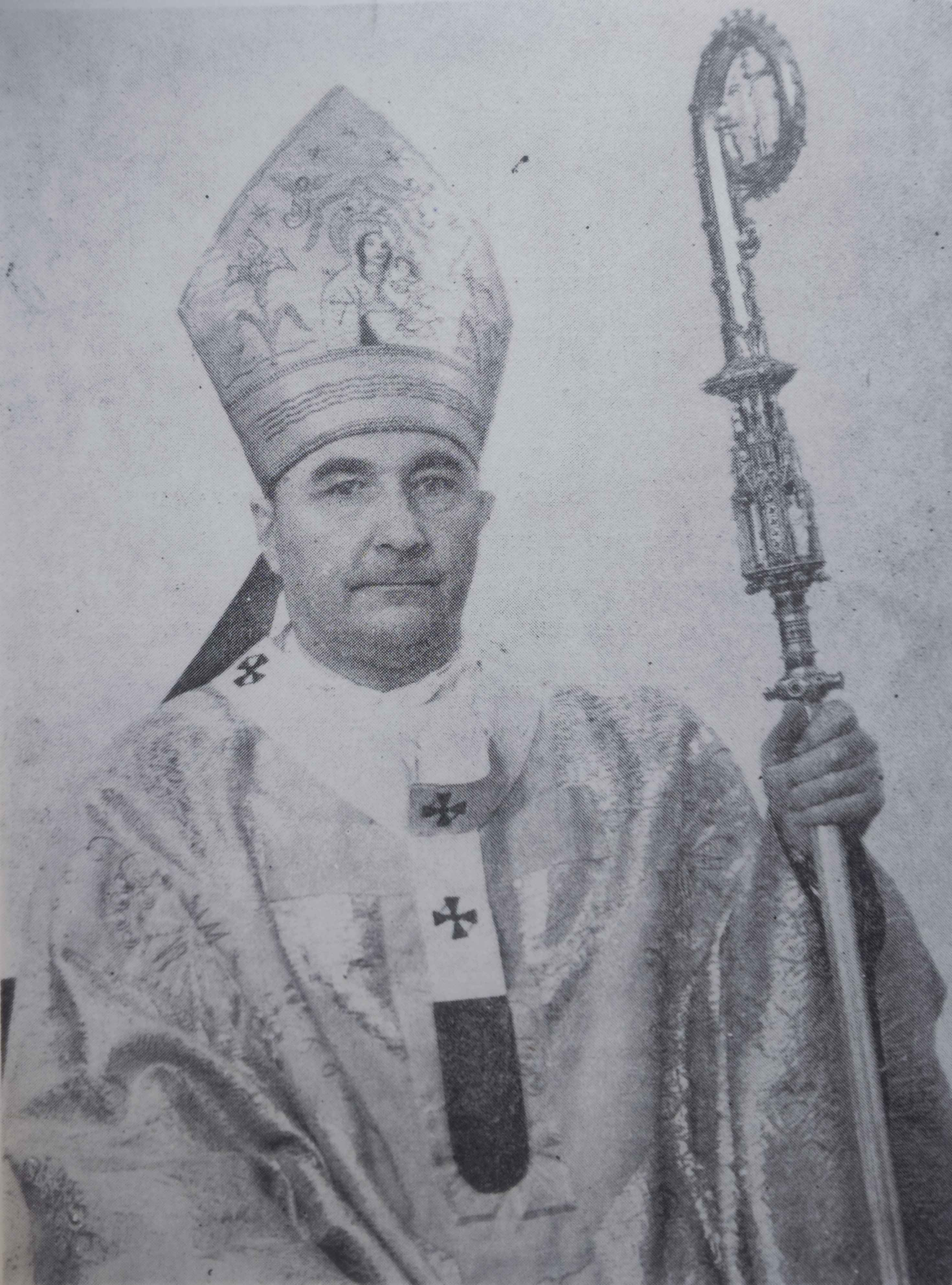
- Appointed: 3 June 1972
- Other post(s): Auxiliary Bishop of Gniezno (1958 – 1972)

Orders
- Ordination: 30 October 1938
- Consecration: 31 August 1958 by Stefan Wyszyński

Personal details
- Born: 4 July 1914; Wolica Pierwsza
- Died: 12 September 1978 (aged 64)

Józef Drzazga (4 July 1914 – 12 September 1978) was a Polish Catholic priest, bishop of Warmia from 1972 to 1978. He was the first post-World War II bishop on that post. He was the titular bishop of Siniandus since 1958.

Catholic Church titles
Vacant Title last held by Maximilian Kaller; 1947–1972 sede vacante	Bishop of Warmia; 1972–1978	Succeeded by Józef Glemp
