= Andreas Thiel (bishop) =

German bishop (1826–1908)

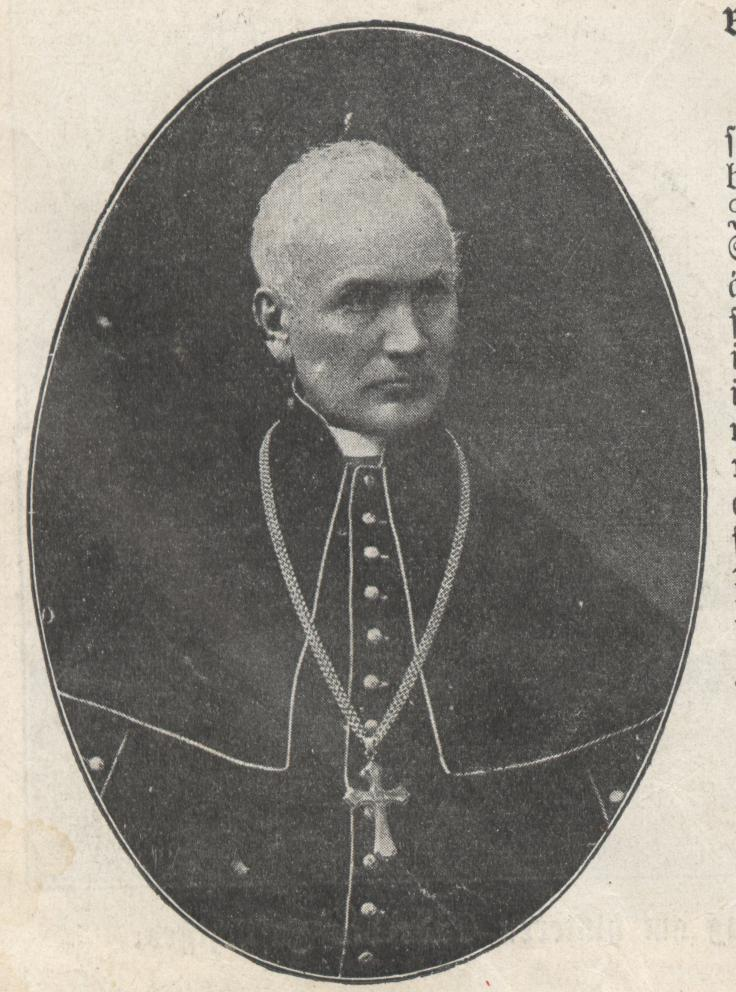
Andreas Thiel (bishop).

Andreas Thiel (28 September 1826 – 17 July 1908) was a Bishop of Ermland (Polish: Warmia) in East Prussia from 1885–1908.

Thiel was born in Lokau (Tłokowo, Gmina Jeziorany, Olsztyn County) in the district of Rößel (Reszel). After attending the local school of Lokau, Thiel visited the gymnasium in Rößel and Braunsberg (Braniewo), where he started to study Catholic divinity at the Collegium Hosianum. Thiel was ordained in 1849 and gained his doctorate in 1853. In 1855 he habilitated as a professor of canon law and ecclesiastical history. Thiel was one of the founders of the Historischer Verein für Ermland (historical association for Ermland) and published several treatises about the regional history.

In 1870 he became capitular of the Frauenburg (Frombork) Cathedral and in 1871 vicar general of the Ermland. In 1885 Thiel received the episcopal consecration. He died in Frauenburg.

Catholic Church titles
Preceded by Philipp Krementz	Bishop of Ermland; 1886–1908	Succeeded by Augustinus Bludau
