= Collegium Hosianum =

Former Jesuit school in Braunsberg (Braniewo), Kingdom of Poland

Coordinates: 54.382°N 19.822°E

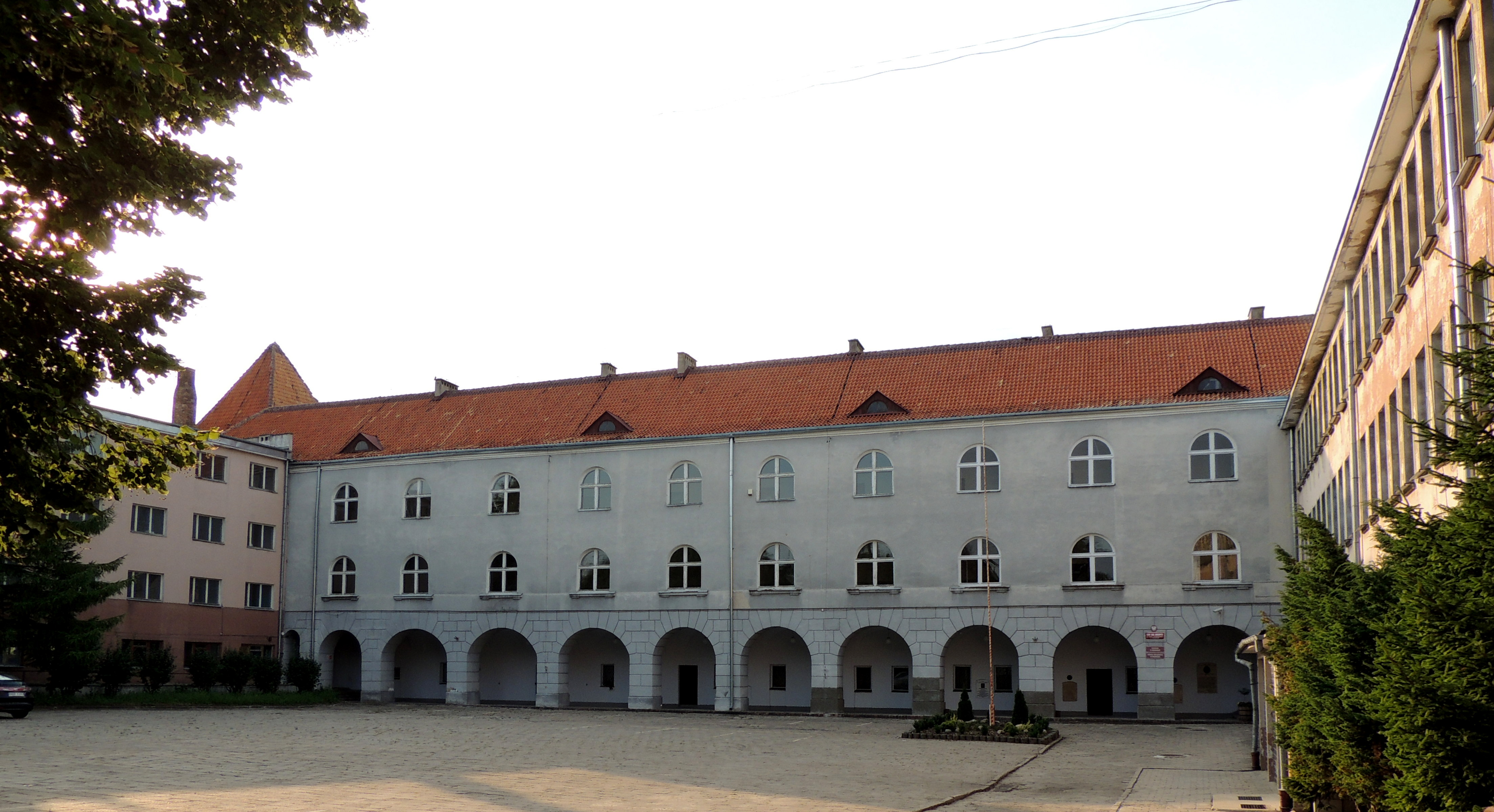
Courtyard Collegium Hosianum, today Vocational School

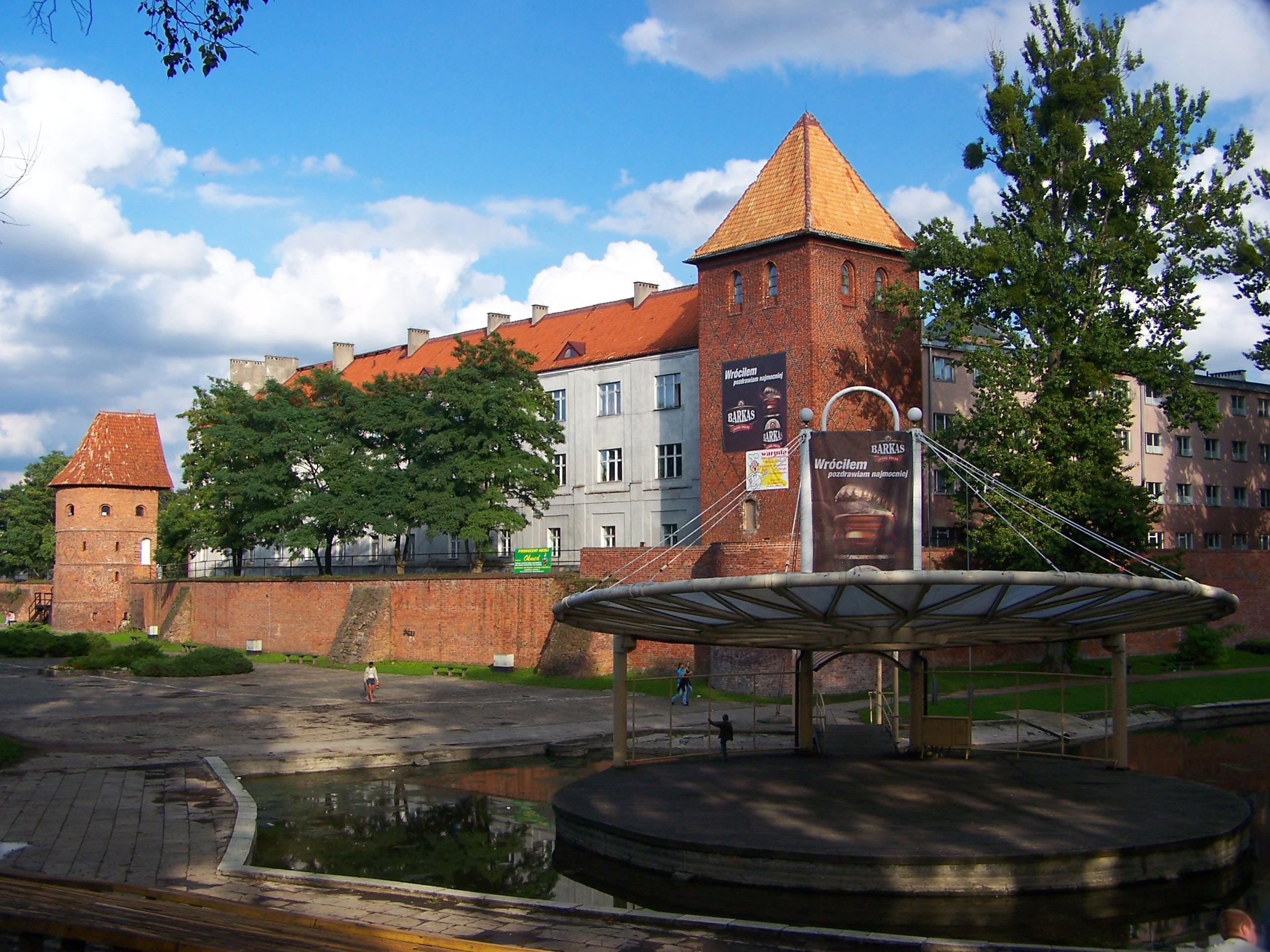
Buildings of the Collegium Hosianum

The Collegium Hosianum was the Jesuit collegium founded in 1565, 1566 by Polish Cardinal Stanislaus Hosius in Braunsberg (Braniewo), Kingdom of Poland. The town was then part of the Polish Prince-Bishopric of Warmia under rule of Cardinal Hosius. The Collegium Hosianum was one of the biggest Jesuit schools and one of the most important centres of Counter-Reformation in Europe and was particularly established to educate Catholic clergy of different countries.

== History ==
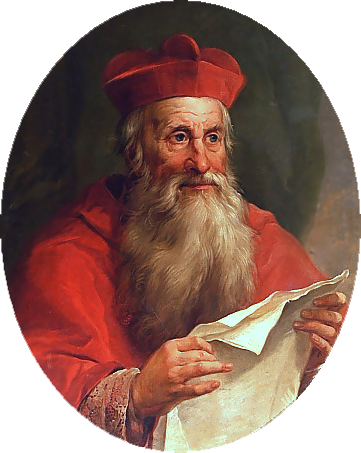
Cardinal Stanislaus Hosius, founder of the Collegium Hosianum

The first Jesuits were called to Warmia by its cardinal Hosius, in order to counter the widespread Protestant movement in Prussia and elsewhere in Central and eastern Europe. The Jesuits arrived 2 November 1564. They were strongly opposed by the largely Protestant Prussian burghers and caused a religious split in the country. Despite difficult material conditions throughout the 16th century, they quickly founded many educational establishments: gymnasium (1565), convictus nobilium - school for Polish szlachta (1565), Diocesan Seminary (1567), Papal Seminary (1578) and dormitory for poor students (1582). The 16th century foundation was designed for 20 Jesuits, but the number soon approached 80, which resulted in problems with the finances of the schools and suitable number of school-rooms.

The Collegium was opened in a former Fransciscan friary. Renovation of the buildings was possible by funds given by Bishopric of Warmia. The Collegium was located in the western part of the building, convictus in the northern, and in the eastern part was located a school. In the first years the gymnasium was not very big due to lack of classrooms. There were five standard "classes" (courses) in it, of which the lowest was "infirma", and the highest was "rhetoric". To the initial problems of the schools were added boycotting by the Protestants and some fights between German and Polish students.

The Collegium in Braniewo distinguished itself from the other Jesuit schools in Poland and all of Europe with a specific curriculum: from 1566 there were taught German language, mathematics, singing and dialectic apart from standard subjects. After opening of the Diocesan and Papal Seminary some theological courses were introduced, and in 1592 also philosophical courses, which was a sign of the high reputation of the school. The school was elite and the number of students was not high, fluctuating from 130 to 300. The Collegium had an international character; besides local Germans, students came from all over Europe, with the majority of Poles, since the 1580s Swedes and Ruthenians added by Antonius Possevinus.

The Collegium was temporally closed in 1626 due to war of Poland with Swedish king Gustavus Adolphus (Polish-Swedish War (1625–1629)), and reopened in 1637. In 1646 Matthaeus Montanus (Matthias Bergh), a canon of Warmia, funded a new, large schoolhouse. In the years 1665-1668 the school was closed again due to destructive Swedish invasion in Prussia and Poland, Swedish Deluge.

In the 18th century in the Collegium humanities, theology, mathematics and Greek and Hebrew languages were taught. In 1701 and later Polish Jesuits applied to Rome for changing the Collegium into full university, but without success. In 1743 they bought from the city of Braunsberg a location for a new schoolhouse, which was built in the next years.

At the time of the Partitions of Poland the prince-bishopric of Warmia with Braunsberg became a part of the Kingdom of Prussia in 1772, and in 1773 the Society of Jesus was suppressed. The Prussian government turned the closed Collegium in 1780 into Gymnasium Academicum, from 1818 called Lyceum Hosianum, which in 1912 became a State Academy.

In 1945 Braunsberg returned to Poland and to its Polish name Braniewo. Of the Collegium, only the ground floor walls and one of the baroque portals were still standing. The rest of the complex was reconstructed between 1960 and 1973, however. A secondary school was reinstated. The right-side corner tower, left over from before the wartime destruction is known as the "Pfaffenturm" (loosely, "priest tower") and recalls the position of the former Franciscan monastery. Today it also comprises the assembly hall of the secondary school. The moat section to the south was known as the "Pflaumengrund" (loosely, "plumb orchard"). A small open-air arena has been installed, surrounded by the moat's remaining water.

== Incomes ==
Fixed incomes of the Ermland Jesuits came from their real estates, which aggregated in 1603 700 zlotys, in 1622 2,540 zlotys, in 1651 3,530 zlotys, in 1681 2,263 zlotys, in 1730 3,102 zlotys, in 1764 5,680 złotys. To the Jesuits belonged (in different periods) villages: Stary Dwór (Althof), Bleishöfen, Kiszpork (Christburg), Daszkowo, Dębiniec, Ławice (Hansdorf), Hiplau, Hirsfelde, Julianowo (Julienshöhe), Klajzak, Krosno (Krossen), Łabuchy (Labuch), Nowa Cerkiew (Neukirchen), Petlików, Rothflies, Ruciana Góra, Sanków, Turznice, Wangory i Wronie.

== Papal Seminary ==
Papal Seminary (Papal Alumnate) was established officially on 15 March 1581. Its founder was Antonius Possevinus. The Papal seminary served as school for the youths from Protestant countries, who after graduating went back to their countries and encouraged their recatholization. Many alumni after graduating came first to Wilno to study philosophy and theology in Jesuit University of Wilno. In the 16th century the number of alumni fluctuated from 23 to 40. In 1586 the Swedish College was established as an autonomous part of the Papal Seminary.

John Drews, rector of the Papal seminary at the end of the 17th century, built a new building with fancy garden and fountains.

== Diocesan Seminary ==
Diocesan Seminary served as a seminary for the Bishopric of Warmia. It was funded by Stanislaus Hosius in 1567 and opened on 25 November 1567. In the 16th century it had from 17 to 24 alumni. Diocesan seminary was directed by a rector of the collegium and by a prefect (lat. praefectus), called later a regens, who was responsible for its students. The Seminary was located in the building of the Priestly Fraternity.

== Novitiate ==
The novitiate of the Polish Province of Society of Jesus was opened in Braunsberg in 1568. The first person who entered the novitiate was Michał Chałkowski, whose examination took place in Braunsberg on 15 June 1569. In the years 1569-1575 126 people applied for admission to the Polish Province of Jesuits, mainly Polish nobles. The first master of novices was Robert Abercromby. The novitiate was located at first in the building of the collegium, then in the old building of the convictus. In 1586 the novitate was moved from Braniewo to Kraków.

== Notable teachers ==
Memorial plaques to notable people associated with the collegium

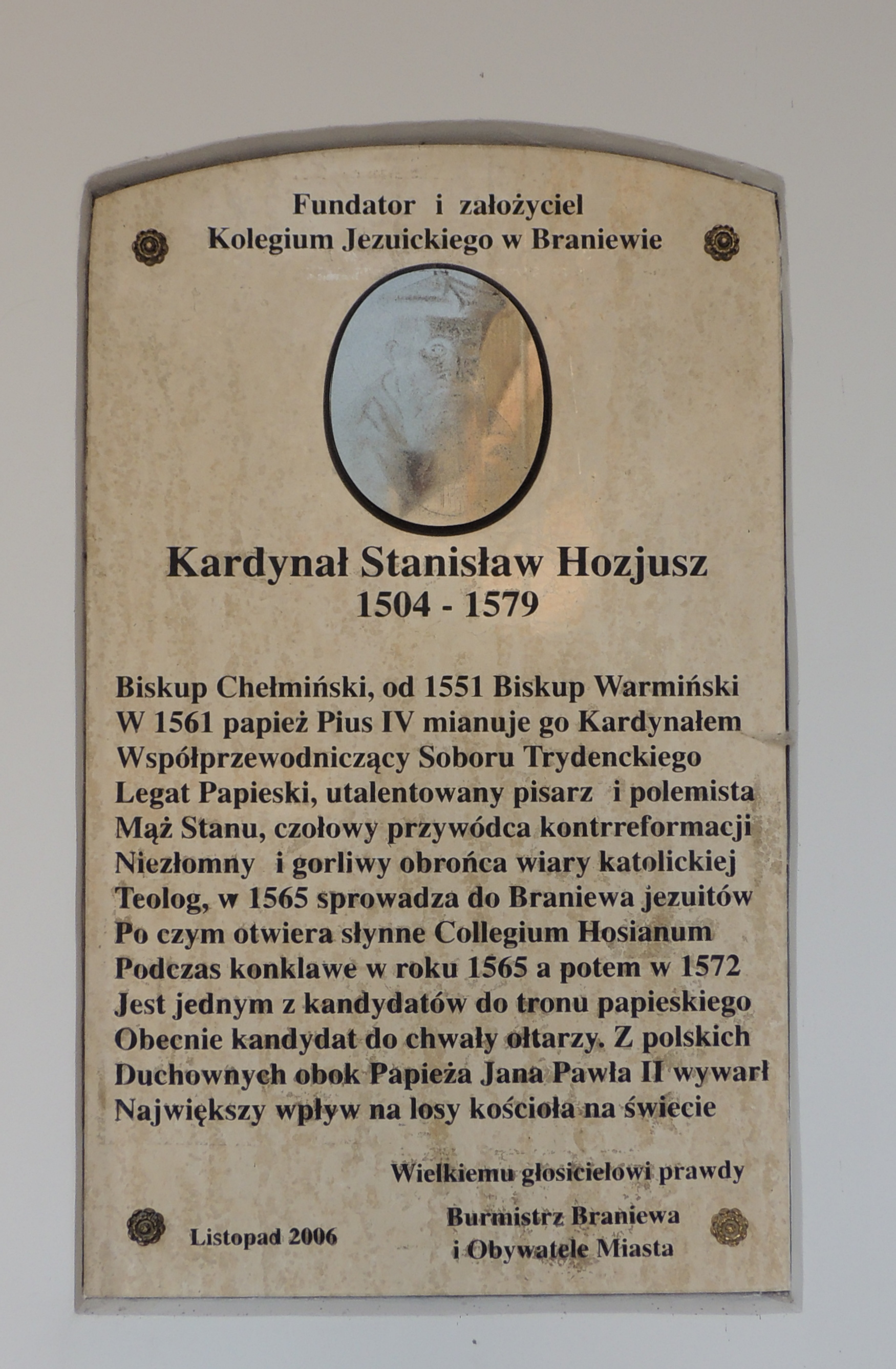
Stanislaus Hosius, founder of the Collegium Hosianum

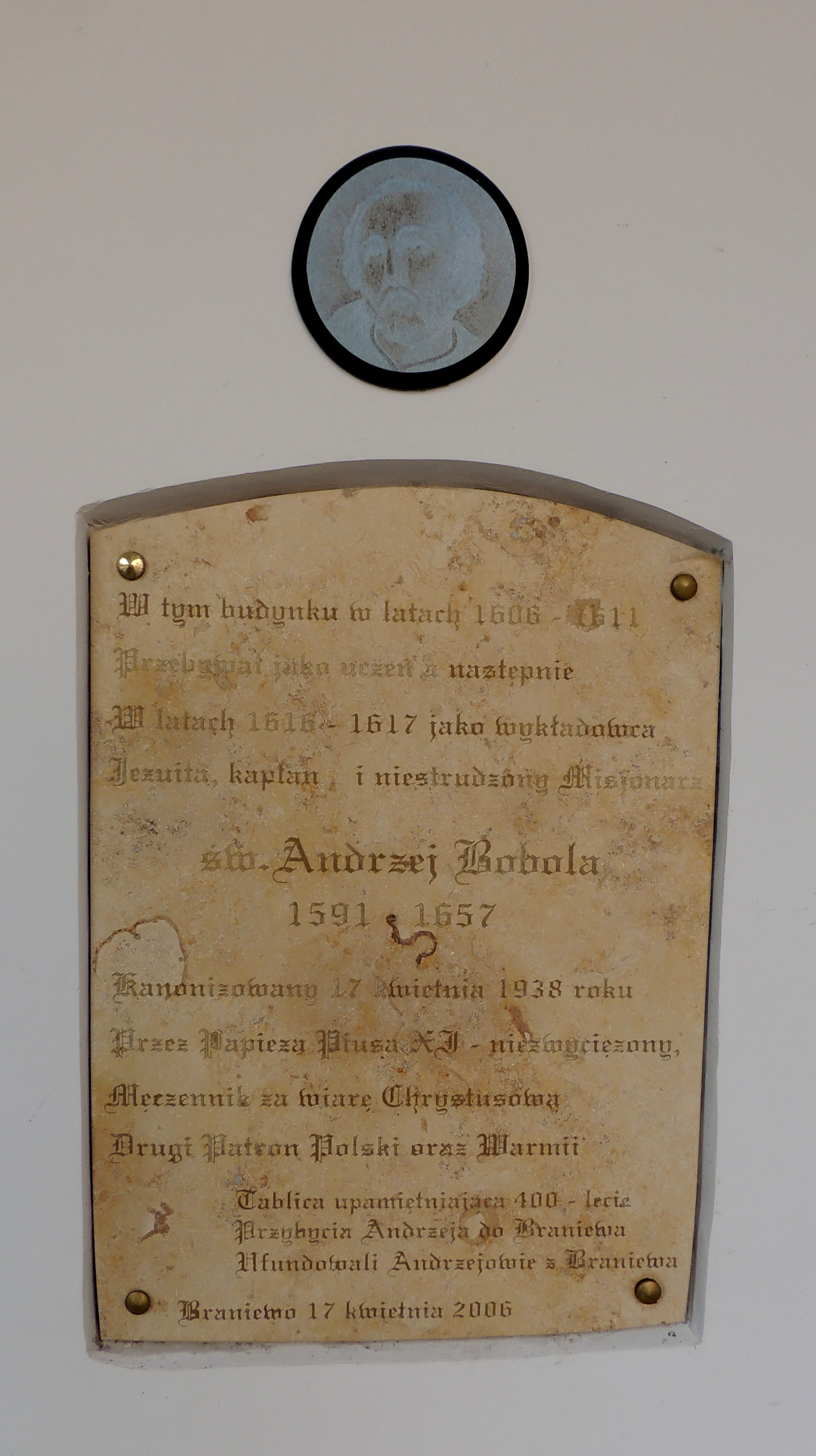
Andrew Bobola, Polish Catholic Saint, missionary and martyr

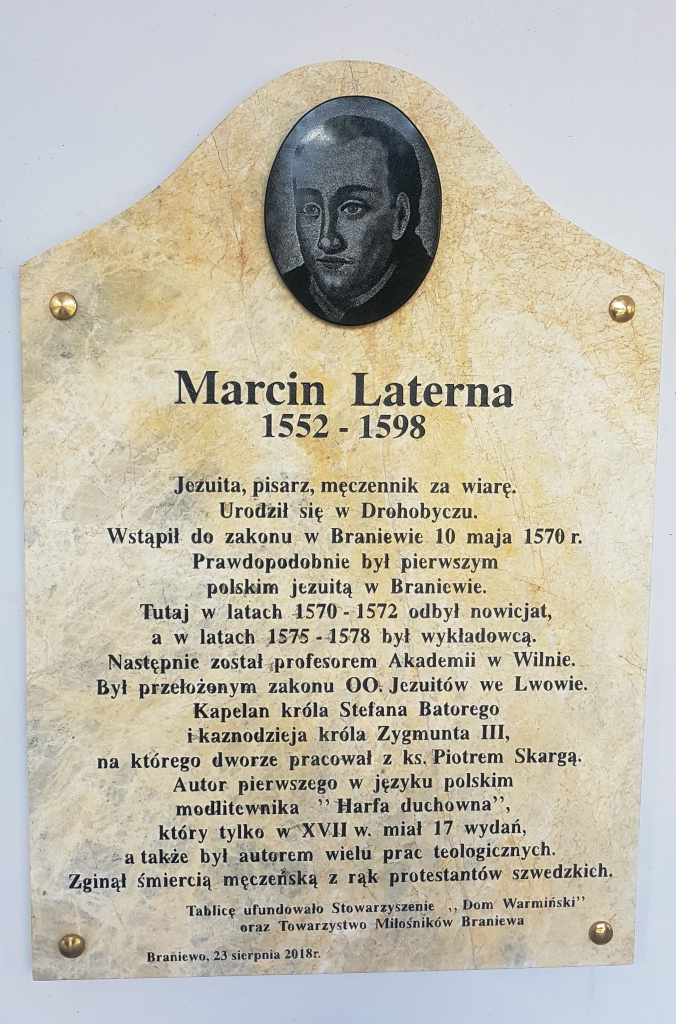
Marcin Laterna, Polish Jesuit and religious writer

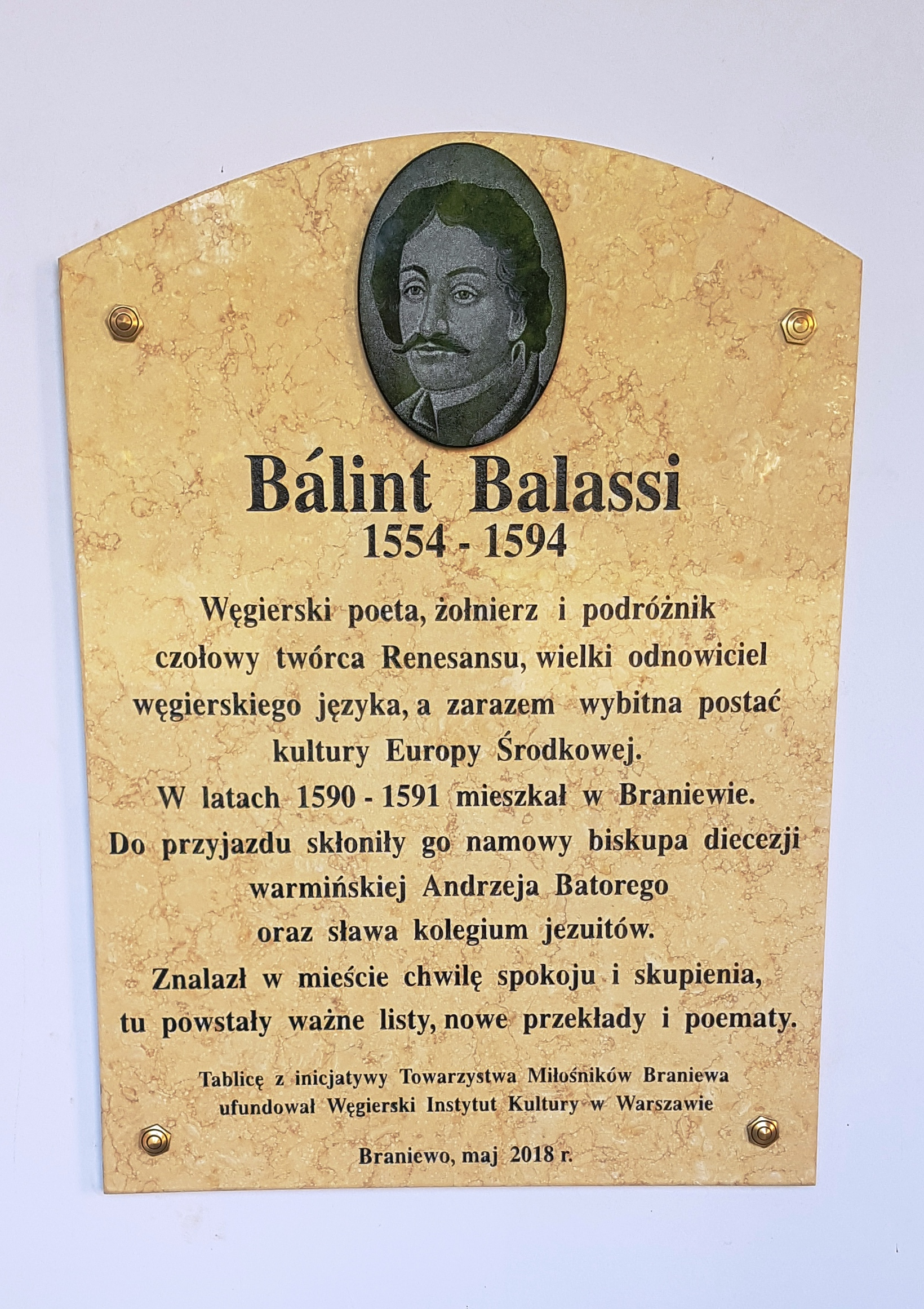
Bálint Balassi, Hungarian Renaissance poet

- Robert Abercromby (1536–1613), Scottish Jesuit missionary, professor of grammar and novice master at the Collegium
- Marcin Laterna (1552–1598), Polish Jesuit and religious writer, preacher of Polish Kings, Professor of Humanities at the Collegium
- Andrew Bobola (1591–1657), Polish Jesuit, missionary, martyr, Catholic Saint, lecturer in the 1610s at the Collegium
- Karl Weierstraß (1815–1897), mathematics teacher in 1848-1856
- Wilhelm Karl Joseph Killing (1847–1923), mathematics teacher
- Franz Josef Niedenzu (1857–1937), Rector
- Władysław Świtalski (1875–1945), Polish priest, professor of theology and philosophy, Rector, murdered by a Russian soldier during World War II in 1945 in Frombork

== Notable students ==
- Mikołaj Zebrzydowski (1553–1620), Polish statesman, Grand Crown Marshal, voivode of Lublin and Kraków
- Mikołaj Jerzy Czartoryski (1585–1662), Polish official, voivode of Podolia and Volhynia
- Piotr Gembicki (1585–1657), Chancellor of Poland, Bishop of Przemyśl and Kraków
- Jan Stanisław Sapieha (1589–1635), Polish-Lithuanian noble and statesman, Court Marshal of Lithuania and Great Lithuanian Marshal
- Jan Działyński (1590–1648), Polish official, voivode of Chełmno
- Andrew Bobola (1591–1657), Polish Jesuit, missionary, martyr, Catholic Saint
- Paweł Jan Działyński (1594–1643), Polish official, voivode of Pomerania
- Maciej Kazimierz Sarbiewski (1595–1640), Polish poet, one of Europe's most prominent Latin poet of the 17th century, renowned theoretician of poetics
- Jan Mikołaj Smogulecki (1610–1656), Polish missionary, explorer, mathematician, astronomer and sinologist, credited with introducing logarithms to China
- Patrick Gordon (1635–1699), Polish, Swedish and Russian military officer of Scottish origin
- Marcin Załuski (1700–1765), Polish priest, Jesuit, auxiliary Bishop of Płock
- Gabriel Podoski (1719–1777), Archbishop of Gniezno and Primate of Poland
- Andreas Thiel (1826–1908), Catholic bishop
- Augustinus Bludau, (1863–1930), Catholic bishop
- Konrad Zuse (1910–1995), computer scientist
- Walter Krupinski (1920–2000), German general

== School library ==
The original library (about 2000 volumes) was plundered by Swedish troops throughout the Polish–Swedish War (1626–1629) and is still existing at the University of Upsala.

== See also ==
- List of early modern universities in Europe
- List of Jesuit sites
