= Augustinus Bludau =

Prussian Catholic bishop (1862–1930)

Augustinus Bludau

Augustinus Bludau (6 March 1862 – 9 February 1930) was a Bishop of Ermland (Polish: Warmia) in East Prussia from 1909 to 1930.

Bludau was born in Guttstadt (Dobre Miasto) as a son of a tailor. After attending the Gymnasium (school) in Elbing, he started to study Catholic divinity at the Collegium Hosianum in Braunsberg (Braniewo). Bludau was ordained in 1887 and worked as a vicar in Marienwerder. He perpetuated his studies in Münster and gained his doctorate in 1891. Afterwards he returned to Braunsberg as a vicar. In 1894, Bludau became apostolic prefect at the bishops seminary and after the death of Andreas Thiel bishop of Ermland.

In 1895, Bludau was appointed a non tenured professor at the University of Münster and in 1899 a full professor of the New Testament.

Bludau died in Frauenburg.

Catholic Church titles
Preceded by Andreas Thiel	Bishop of Ermland; 1909–1930	Succeeded by Maximilian Kaller
