= Tomasz Ptak =

Polish footballer

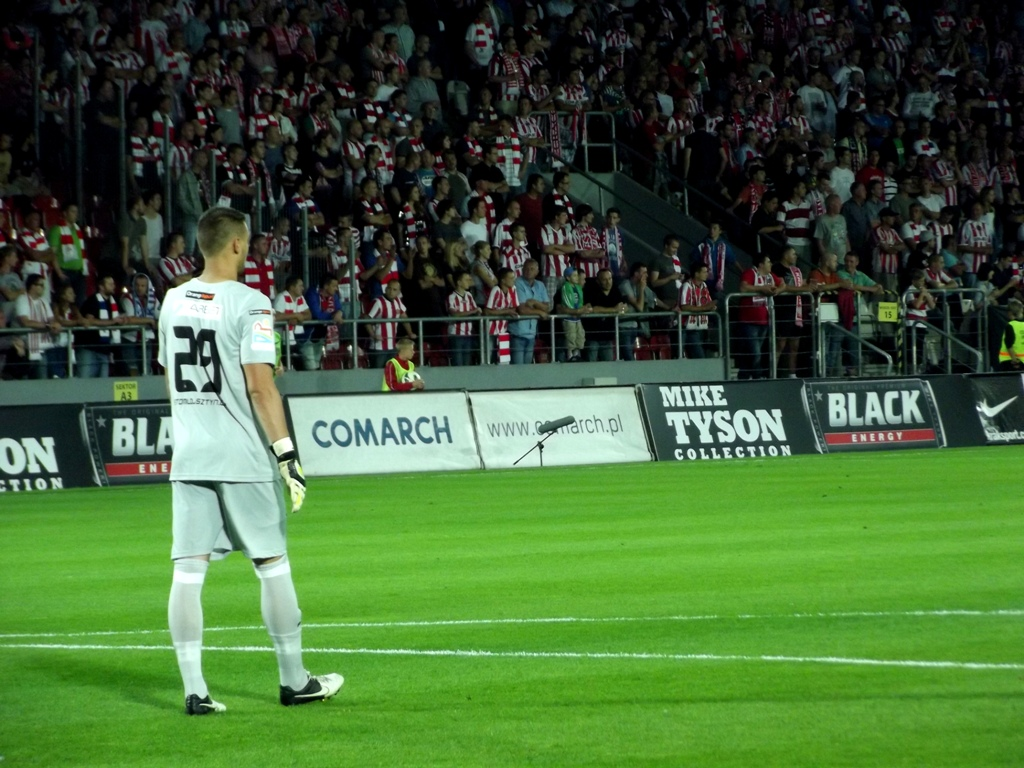
- Ptak with Stomil Olsztyn in 2012

Personal information
- Full name: Tomasz Ptak
- Date of birth: 9 February 1992 (age 34)
- Place of birth: Braniewo, Poland
- Height: 1.94 m (6 ft 4 in)
- Position: Goalkeeper

Team information
- Current team: Zatoka Braniewo
- Number: 92

Youth career
- 2006–2008: Zatoka Braniewo
- 2008–2009: MSP Szamotuły

Senior career*
Years	Team	Apps	(Gls)
2009–2010	Sparta Szamotuły		
2010–2011	Górnik Konin	14	(0)
2011–2013	Jagiellonia Białystok	9	(0)
2012	→ Stomil Olsztyn (loan)	17	(0)
2013	→ Motor Lublin (loan)	14	(0)
2013	Jagiellonia Białystok II	2	(0)
2013–2014	Zagłębie Lubin II	5	(0)
2013–2015	Zagłębie Lubin	8	(0)
2015–2021	Zatoka Braniewo		
2022–	Zatoka Braniewo	39	(0)

International career
2009	Poland U17	1	(0)
2012	Poland U21	1	(0)
- * Club domestic league appearances and goals as of 21 December 2024

Tomasz Ptak (born 9 February 1992) is a Polish professional footballer who plays as a goalkeeper for Zatoka Braniewo. He joined the Polish Land Forces in 2016 and was assigned to duty in Latvia following the 2020–21 season.

== Football career ==
Zatoka Braniewo was his first youth team; he was admitted to MSP Szamotuły football academy in 2007, where he worked with goalkeeping coach Andrzej Dawidziuk, who he credits with being an early inspiration. He played for Sparta Szamotuły during the 2009–10 season; on 28 October 2009, he played 90 minutes for Poland's U17 team against Bulgaria. He briefly played for Górnik Konin in the fall of 2010. His debut came on 1 October 2011; Jaga defeated Zagłębie Lubin. He was relegated back to the Młoda Ekstraklasa team after Grzegorz Sandomierski returned from playing abroad. In 2011, he was flown to England to train with Liverpool goalkeepers for eight days.

When he returned, he signed a four-year contract with Jagiellonia Białystok. In the summer of 2012, he went to Stomil on loan, where he played 17 games and remained until November. In the short break period between leaving Stomil and returning to Jaga, Ptak played in a friendly Poland U21 match against Bosnia and Herzegovina. In 2013, he was loaned to Motor Lublin on a six-month contract. At the end of the summer, he left Jaga to sign a three-year contract with Zagłębie Lubin, where he was placed on the reserve team. Prior to signing with Lubin, he attended training camp for Wisła Płock. He stayed in Lubin until 2015 and played 8 games total. At this time, he was pursued by Olimpia but ultimately returned to Zakota Braniewo to play for his home club. Zakota played in the 2017 Polish championships.

In 2016, Ptak joined the Polish Land Forces and in 2021, he left Zakota to deploy to Latvia as part of the NATO Enhanced Forward Presence campaign.

== Personal life ==
Ptak was born 9 February 1992 in Braniewo, Warmia-Mazury Province, Poland and is a lifelong Liverpool and Jerzy Dudek fan. He believes goalkeeper training is lacking and wants to become a goalkeeper coach after he retires from playing.
