= Regina Protmann =

Blessed Regina Protmann
- Born: 1552; Braniewo (Braunsberg), Kingdom of Poland
- Died: 18 January 1613 (aged 60); Braunsberg
- Venerated in: Roman Catholic Church
- Beatified: 13 June 1999, Warsaw, Poland by Pope John Paul II
- Feast: 18 January
- Patronage: Braniewo

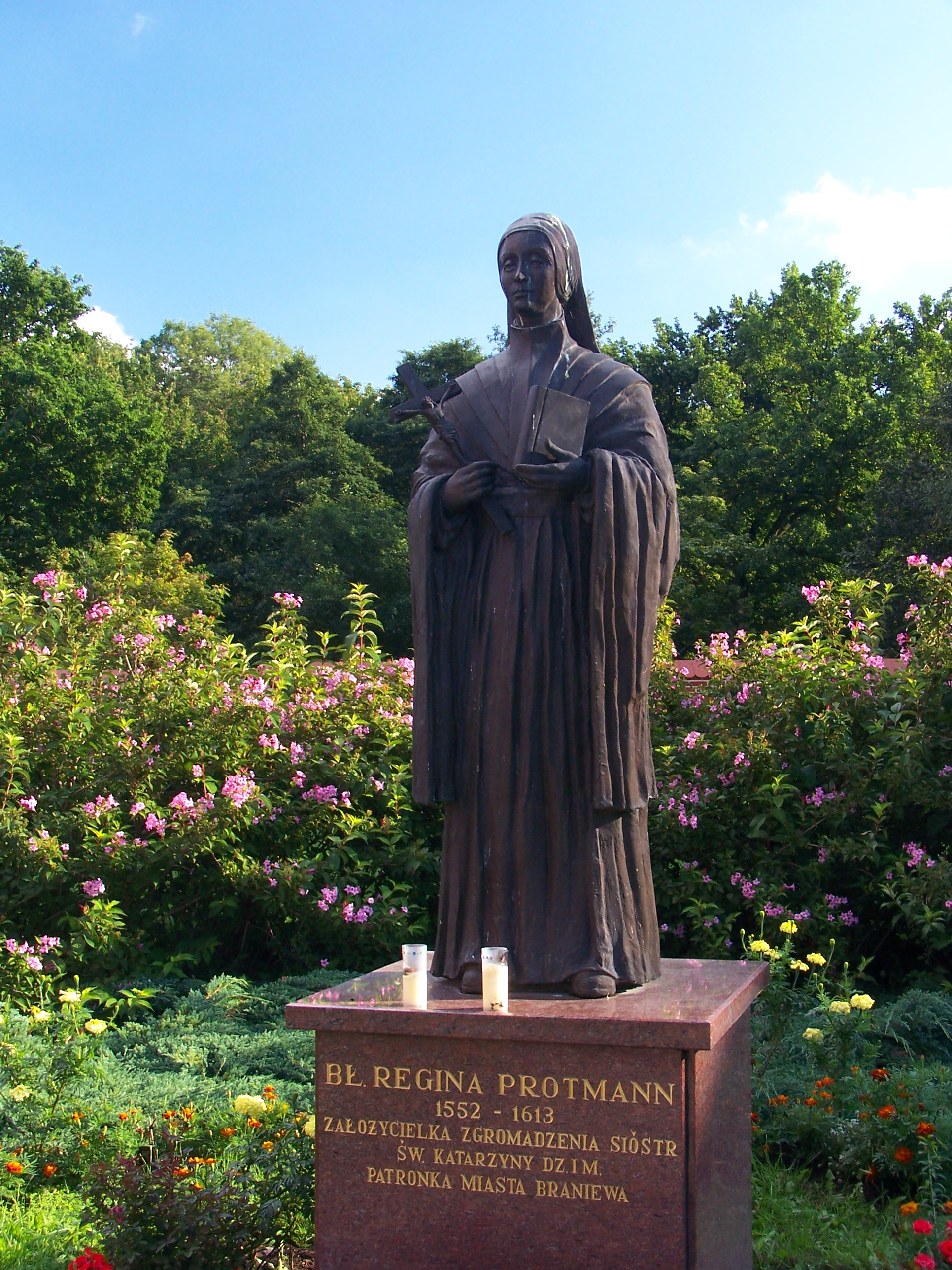
A Regina Protmann memorial in Braniewo.

Regina Protmann (1552 – 18 January 1613) was a Roman Catholic religious sister. She founded the Sisters of Saint Catherine and was a pioneer in the establishment of hospitals as well as schools for girls. Her first biographer was the Jesuit Engelbert Keilert who described her as an intelligent and well-versed woman with a deep faith and sense of conviction.

Her beatification was celebrated on 13 June 1999 in Warsaw.

== Life ==
Regina Protmann was born in Braniewo (Braunsberg) in 1552 and to Peter Protmann and Regina née Tingel. Her father was a merchant and local patrician. Her uncle was a councilman.

Protmann became familiarized with religious and political matters during the time of the Protestant Reformation and the Counter Reformation. She joined a Marian group that the Jesuits had set up and she entrusted herself to their spiritual care. In 1571, she explained to her parents that she could not be married as expected but was devoting herself to religious studies and taking care of the sick and poor.

Despite the opposition of her parents Protmann moved out on her own and with two other women lived in an abandoned house. The group made a living in taking care of and nursing the sick and also doing housework. During a time of witch-hunt and strict counter-measures from the Roman Catholic Church it was unheard of for women to live on their own. There were no convents for women in the area at that time.

Protmann persevered and, inspired by Saint Catherine of Alexandria, founded one which became the congregation of the Sisters of Saint Catherine. Protmann helped to nurse the sick and educated nurses while seeing to it that nurses themselves received care when it was needed. Under the government of the prince-bishops schools for males existed alone but Protmann founded schools for girls as well.

Protmann died in 1613 after a painful illness she contracted that winter while on a travel trip.

=== World War II and after ===
The Saint Catherine of Alexandria church in Braunsberg was ruined in 1945 during its capture by the Soviet forces during World War II. Braniewo was assigned to Poland. During the expulsion of the inhabitants of East Prussia, including the sisters of her congregation, over 100 sisters died. It was rebuilt after 1979 and in 2001 dedicated as a Minor Basilica. On 28 June 2000, Protmann was declared the patroness of Braniewo.

== Beatification ==
The beatification process opened in Warmia and in Frascati in an informative that opened in 1957 and closed sometime later before it received the validation needed from the Congregation for the Causes of Saints on 19 September 1991. The Congregation for the Causes of Saints approved the cause on 27 October 1992. Pope John Paul II confirmed Protmann's heroic virtue and name her as venerable on 17 December 1996. A miracle due to her intercession was a healing that originated in Brazil. John Paul II beatified Protmann in Warsaw on 13 June 1999. The postulator for this cause is Sr. Józefa Krause.
