= Tłokowo =

- Village
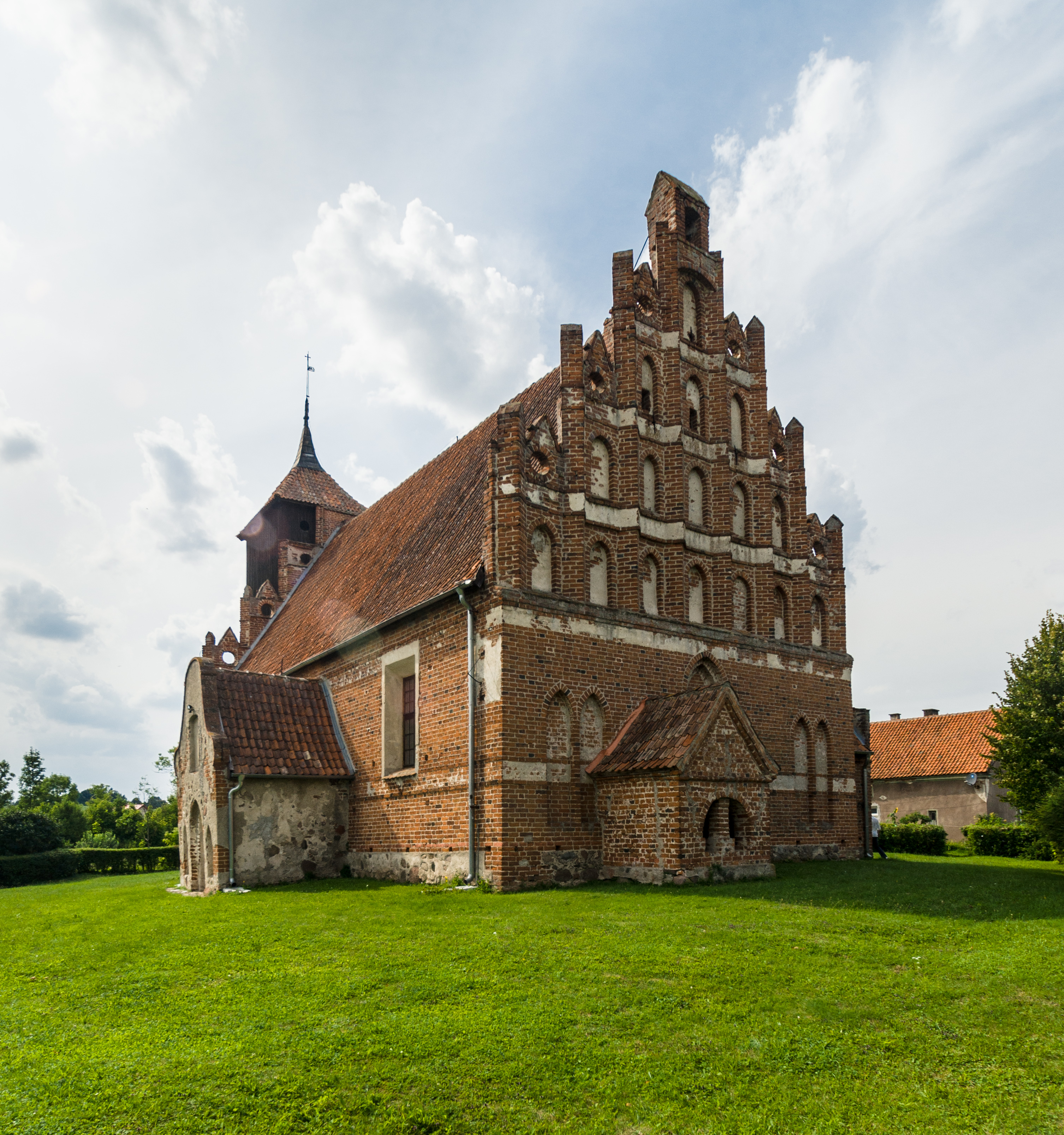
- Saint John the Baptist church in Tłokowo

- Location within Poland
- Coordinates: 53°59′41″N 20°44′17″E
- Country: Poland
- Voivodeship: Warmian-Masurian
- County: Olsztyn
- Gmina: Jeziorany
- Population (2006): 610

Tłokowo [twɔˈkɔvɔ] is a village in the administrative district of Gmina Jeziorany, within Olsztyn County, Warmian-Masurian Voivodeship, in northern Poland.

== Notable residents ==
- Andreas Thiel (1826–1908), Bishop
