= Robert Abercromby (Jesuit) =

Scottish Jesuit missionary

Robert Abercromby (1536 – 27 April 1613), whose surname was also spelled as Abrecromby and Abercrombie, and was known by such pseudonyms as Robert Sandiesoun and Sanders Robertson, was a Scottish Jesuit missionary.

== Early life ==
He was born at Murthly in Perth and Kinross and educated at the University of St Andrews. He studied in the Collegium Romanum in Rome, where on 19 August 1563 he became a Jesuit. From 1564 he lived in Braunsberg (then in Royal Prussia; present-day Braniewo) where he was professor of grammar in the biggest Polish Jesuit collegium (where teaching was in Latin) and a novice master.

In 1565 he was ordained a priest. In Braniewo he was in constant contact with Stanislaus Hosius. Learning Polish was difficult for him, and he had some problems with the finances of the school. Due to these problems he was permitted to leave Poland in 1580, when he met the Scottish king for the first time. In September 1580 he went back to Poland - from 1580 to 1587 he performed similar tasks in Kraków, Poznań and Wilno.

In 1587 he left Poland and returned to Scotland. During the journey to Scotland in 1580 and during his second stay there he was organizing transports of Scottish Catholic novices to be trained in Polish schools and seminaries.

== Contact with Anne of Denmark ==
Abercromby claimed that he had reconciled Anne of Denmark, queen of James VI of Scotland, to the Catholic Church. James apparently allowed Abercromby to meet her at Holyroodhouse circa 1599. She made no outward sign of a change of religion.

== Later life ==
Abercromby remained in Scotland for some time, but a price of 10,000 crowns was put upon his head. He spent the period 1601–06 under the protection of George Gordon, 1st Marquess of Huntly.

Abercromby went back to Braunsberg in 1606. His name was connected to the allegiance oath controversy when a pamphlet "pasquil", Exetasis epistolæ nomine regis, written under the pseudonym Bartholus Pacenius against James I was traced to Braunsberg; but the investigation by Patrick Gordon was inconclusive. He died there on 27 April 1613.
