= Braniewo Castle =

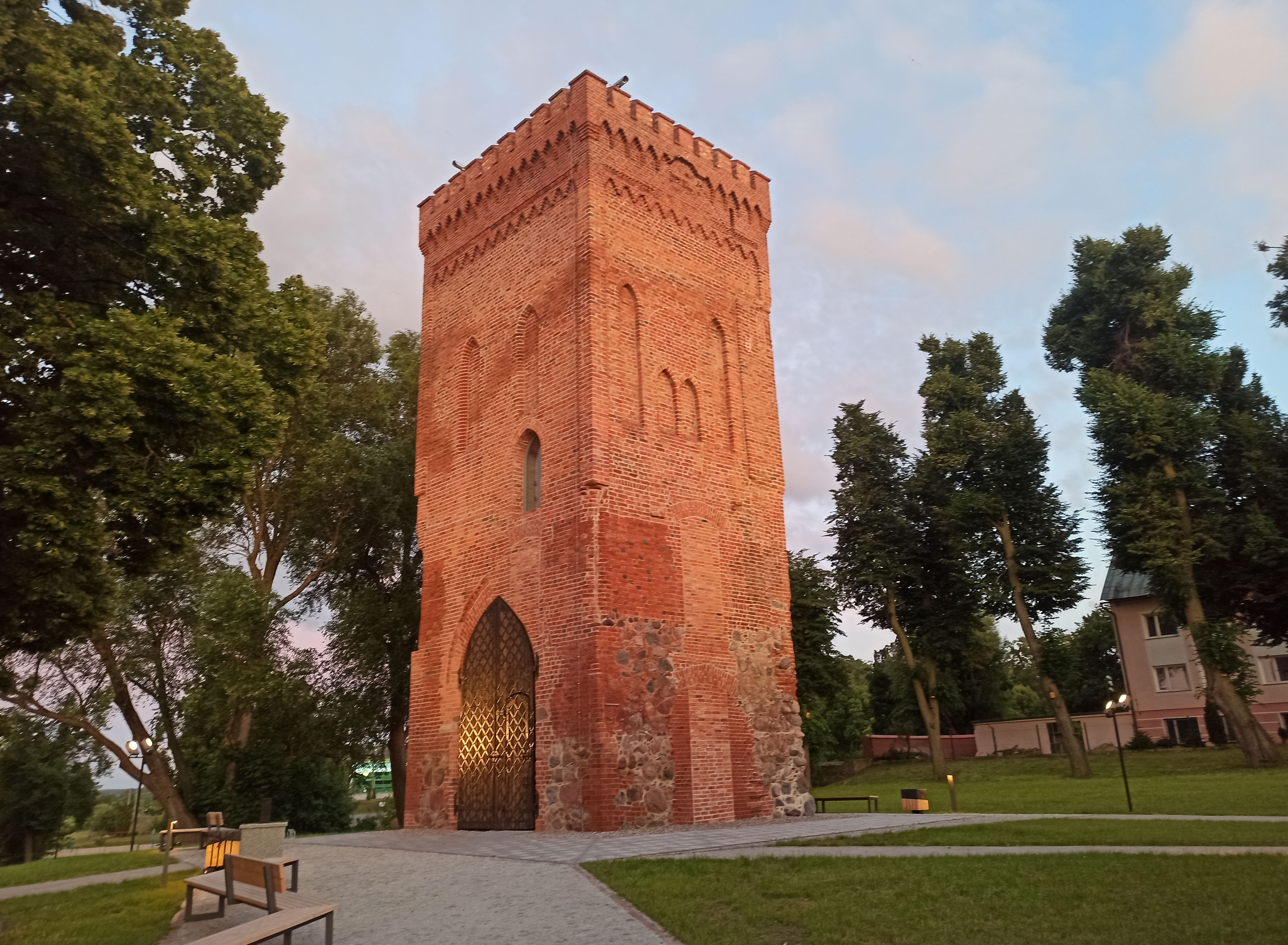
- Braniewo Castle

- Location of Braniewo Castle in Poland Braniewo Castle (Warmian-Masurian Voivodeship)
- 54°22′54″N 19°49′32″E
- Location: Braniewo, Warmian-Masurian Voivodeship, in Poland

History
- Built: 1279–1300

Site notes
- Architectural style: Gothic

Braniewo Castle (Polish: Zamek w Braniewie, German: Bischofsburg Braunsberg) was a castle in Braniewo, Poland, built in the thirteenth century. The castle's remains are located in south-eastern side of the Old Town by St. Catherine's Basilica.

== History ==
The castle was built during the lifetime of Bishop Heinrich Fleming (1279–1300). After the year of 1340, the residence of the Warmian Bishops was moved to Wormditt (today Orneta), the castle became the residence of the Burgrave. In 1454, the castle was seized by the Kingdom of Poland, and up to 1461 the castle was the residence of the Warmian Bishops. In 1626 Braniewo was captured by Gustavus Adolphus. During the years of 1633 to 1635, the castle was seized by the Swedes, which built bastions around the castle and bulwarks. In 1811, the castle housed a school. In the years of 1873 to 1874, certain portions of the castle's fortifications were deconstructed. The castle was burned down during the Vistula–Oder Offensive of 1945. The ruins were deconstructed in 1958. The remains of the castle is a tower with a chapel on the second floor.

== See also ==
- Castles in Poland
