= Braniewo =

Town in Warmian-Masurian Voivodeship, Poland

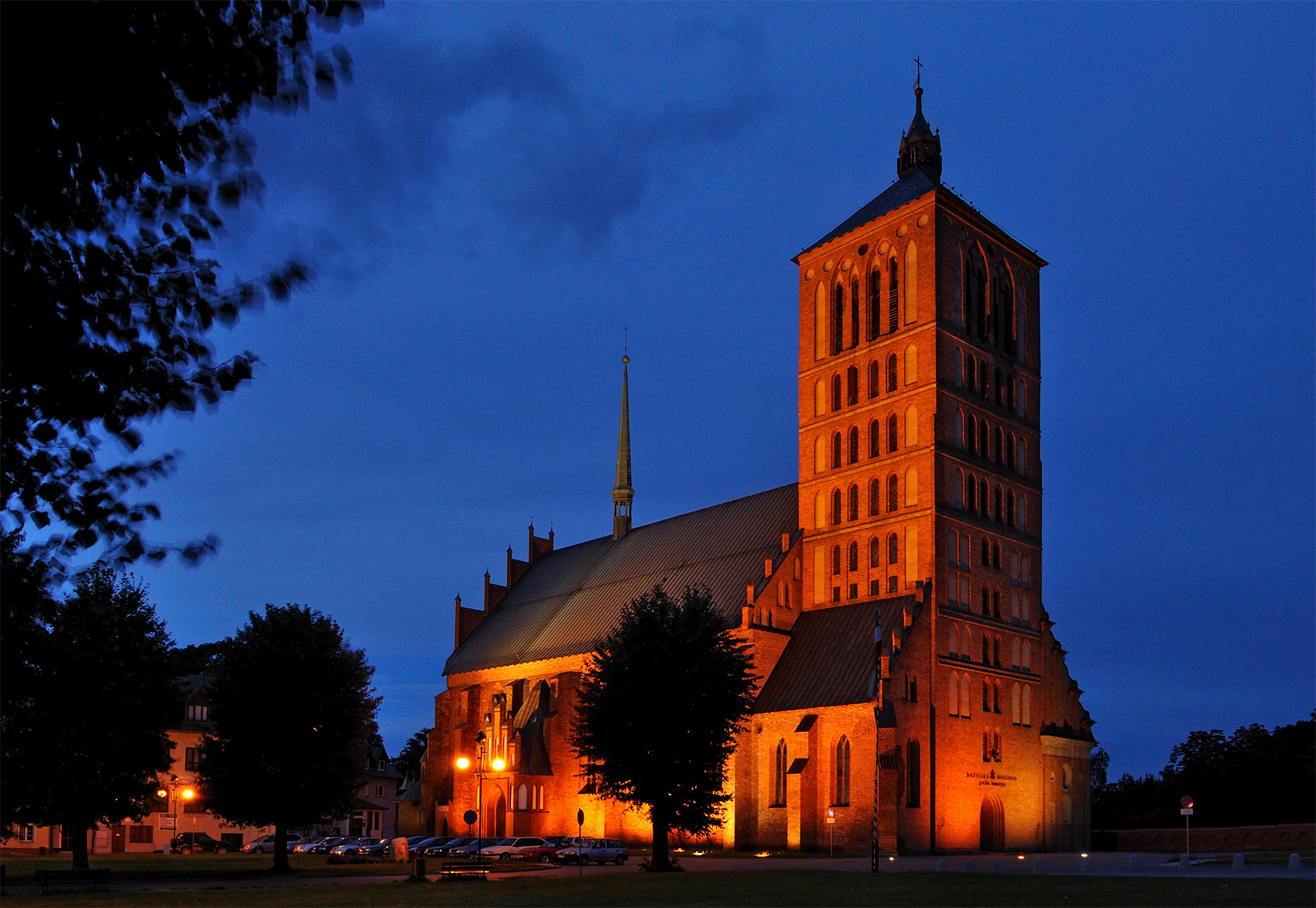
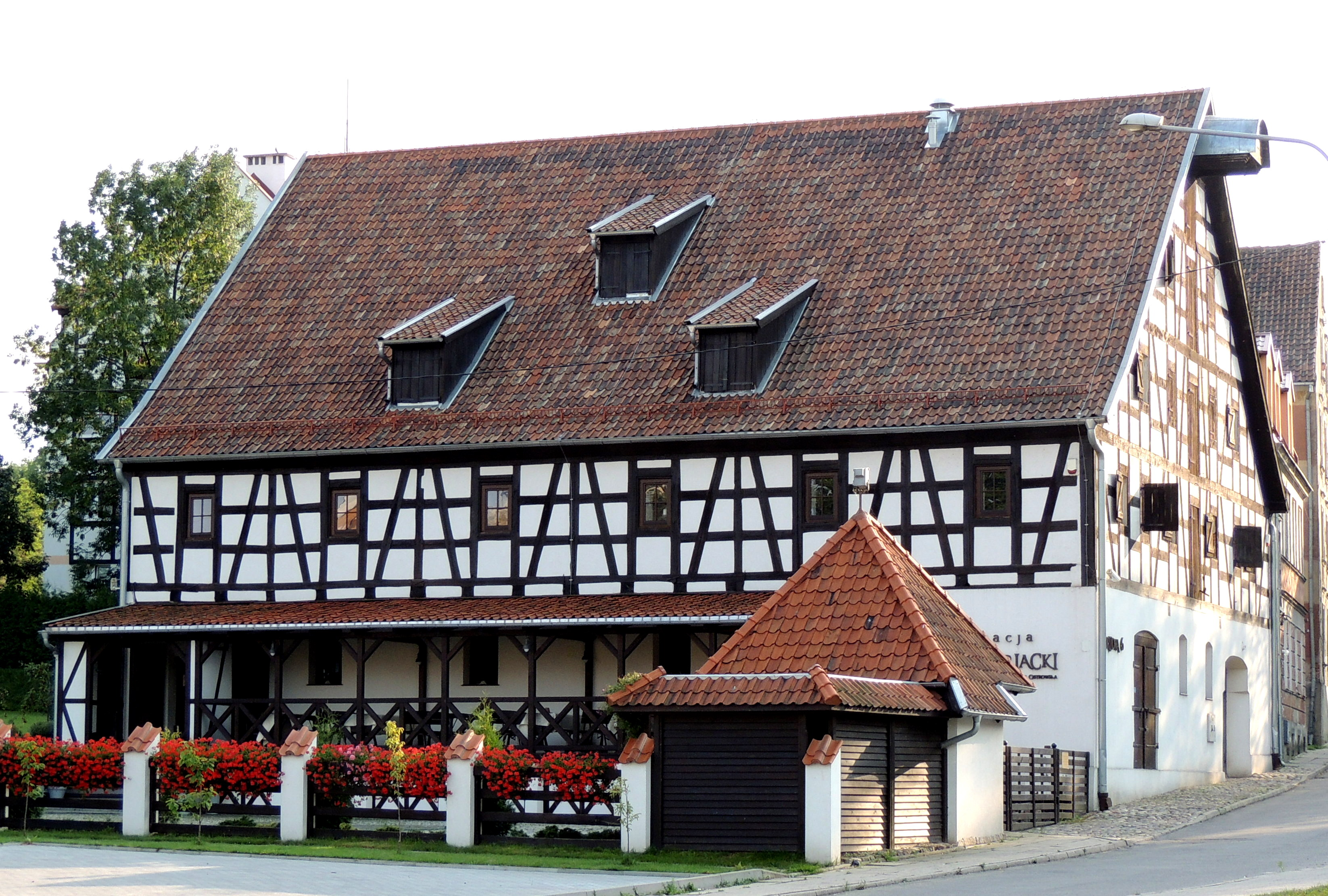
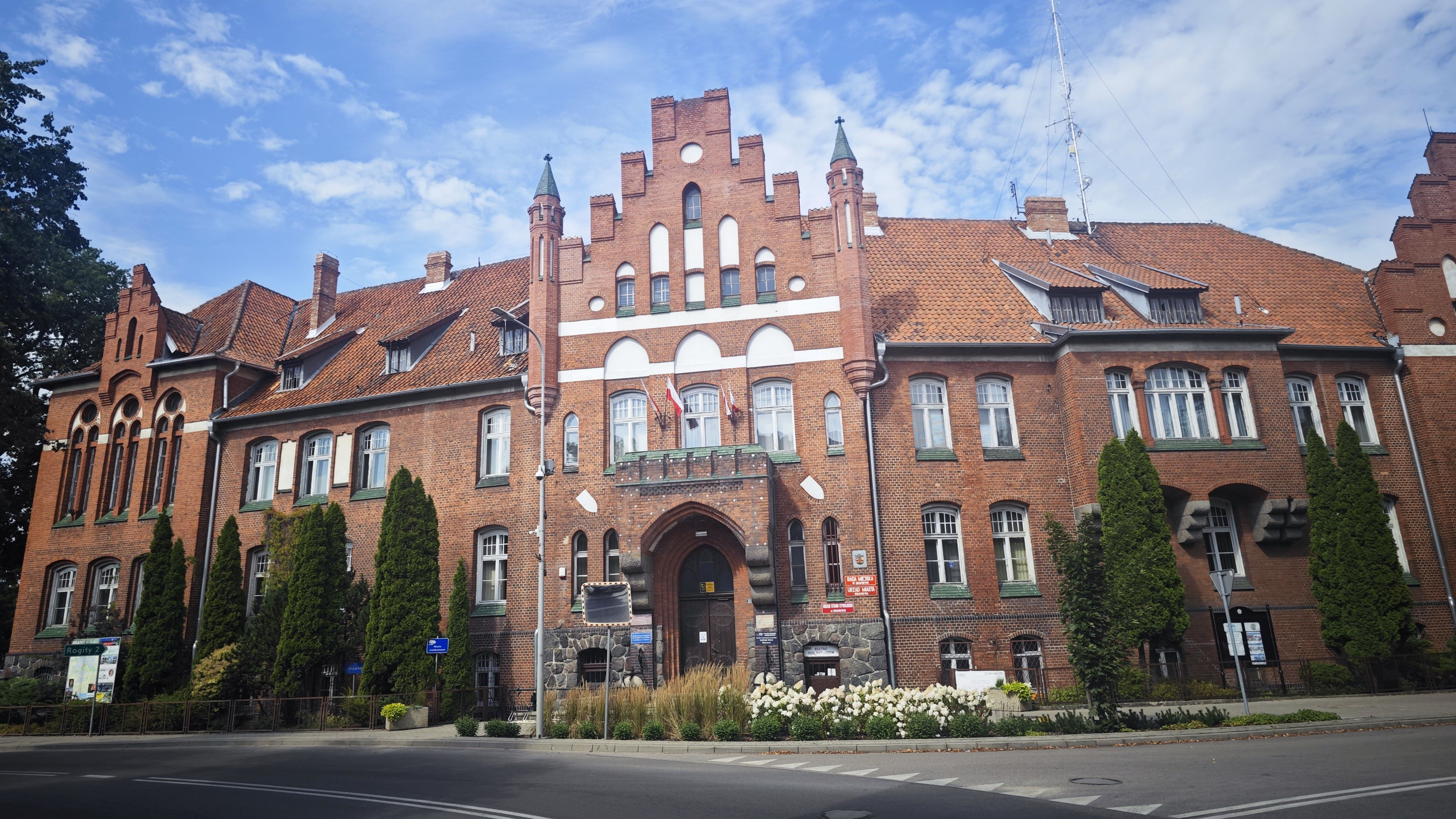
- Saint Catherine Basilica Old granary Municipal office

- Flag Coat of arms
- Interactive map of Braniewo
- Location within Poland
- Coordinates: 54°23′N 19°50′E
- Country: Poland
- Voivodeship: Warmian-Masurian
- County: Braniewo
- Gmina: Braniewo (urban gmina)
- Established: 13th century
- Town rights: 1254

Government
  - Mayor: Tomasz Sielicki (PSL)

Area
  - Total: 12.36 km^{2} (4.77 sq mi)

Population (30 June 2021)
  - Total: 16,907
  - Density: 1,368/km^{2} (3,543/sq mi)
- Time zone: UTC+1 (CET)
  - Summer (DST): UTC+2 (CEST)
- Postal code: 14-500
- Area code: +48 55
- Car plates: NBR
- Climate: Dfb
- Website: www.braniewo.pl

Braniewo ([braˈɲɛvɔ]) (German: Braunsberg in Ostpreußen) is a town in northern Poland, in Warmia, in the Warmian-Masurian Voivodeship, with a population of 16,907 as of June 2021. It is the capital of Braniewo County.

Founded in the Middle Ages, Braniewo is the oldest city in Warmia, and currently the second largest (after Olsztyn), and was its first capital until 1340. From the late medieval period, it prospered from international trade, and in the early modern period, it was a significant center of higher education in Poland, called the "Athens of the North." Additionally, since the 16th century Braniewo is a noted center for brewing. The town features heritage sites in a variety of styles, including Gothic, Baroque, Neoclassical and Gothic Revival. Braniewo hosts a garrison of the Polish Armed Forces and is a member of Cittaslow.

== Location ==
Braniewo lies on the Pasłęka River about 5 km (3 mi) from the Vistula Lagoon, about 35 km (22 mi) northeast of Elbląg and 55 km (34 mi) southwest of Kaliningrad (Polish: Królewiec). The Polish border with Russia's Kaliningrad Oblast lies 6 km (4 mi) north, and may be reached from Braniewo via National road 54.

== History ==
=== Middle Ages ===
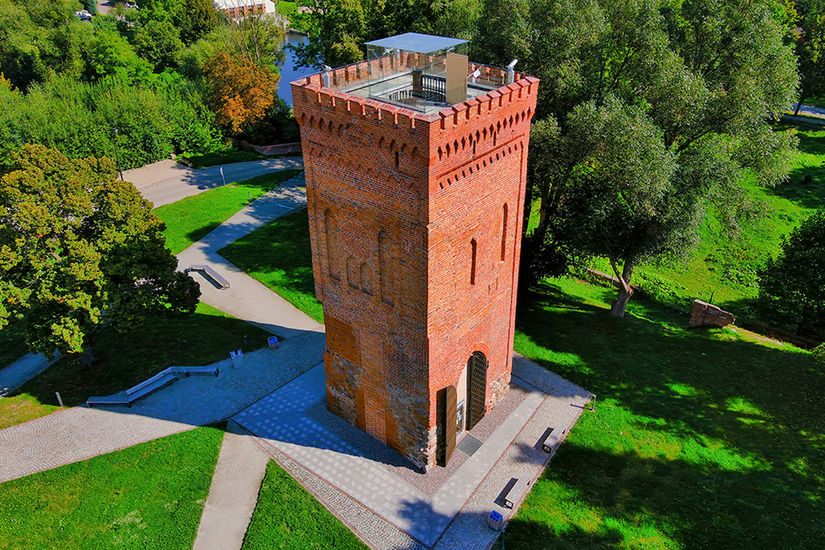
Remains of the Braniewo Castle

According to the German geographer Johann Friedrich Goldbeck (1748–1812), the town originally was named Brunsberg after Bruno von Schauenburg (1205–1281), bishop of Olomouc in Moravia, who accompanied King Ottokar II of Bohemia in 1254 and 1267 when the latter participated in the crusade of the Teutonic Knights against the Old Prussians. It has also been suggested that the name Braunsberg might stem from Brusebergue ("camp of the Prussians"), but this notion is not documented.

In 1243, the settlement and the surrounding region of Warmia was given by the Teutonic Order to the newly created Bishopric of Warmia, whose bishop built his cathedral in the town and made it his chief residence. The city was granted town privileges based on those of Lübeck in 1254, but in 1261 was destroyed and depopulated during the second of the Prussian Uprisings. It was rebuilt in a new location in 1273 and settled by colonists from Lübeck. In 1284, it was given a new town charter, again based on that of Lübeck. However, the next bishop, Heinrich Fleming (1278–1300), transferred the chapter from Braunsberg to Frauenburg (now Frombork).

In 1296, a Franciscan abbey was built, and in 1342, a "new town" was added. As the most important trading and harbor city in Warmia, the town prospered as member of the Hanseatic League, which it remained until 1608. The town maintained trade contacts with England, Sweden, Denmark, the Netherlands, and Livonia.

In 1440, the town was one of the founding members of the Prussian Confederation, which opposed Teutonic rule, and upon the request of which King Casimir IV Jagiellon incorporated the territory to the Kingdom of Poland in 1454. The town pledged allegiance to the Polish King and recognized his rule in March 1454 in Kraków. After the subsequent Thirteen Years' War, the Teutonic Knights renounced any claims to the town in the Second Peace of Thorn in 1466. Administratively, it was part of the Prince-Bishopric of Warmia in the new autonomous province of Royal Prussia, later on also in the Greater Poland Province.

=== Early modern era ===
After the secularization of the Teutonic Order in 1525, a large part of its residents converted to Lutheran Protestantism. Duke Albert, who had been grand master of the Order, sought to unite Warmia with Ducal Prussia (a nearby vassal state of Poland), causing the Catholics of the town to swear allegiance to the king of Poland in return for aid against Protestant Prussia. In 1526 a Polish royal commission released Braunsberg burghers from the oath to the Polish king and handed the town back to Prince-Bishop Mauritius Ferber. However, just like the entire area of Warmia, Braunsberg swore allegiance to the Prince-Bishops of Warmia. Additionally, it had to denounce all Lutheran teachings and hand over Lutheran writings. Thereafter Warmia remained predominantly Roman Catholic.

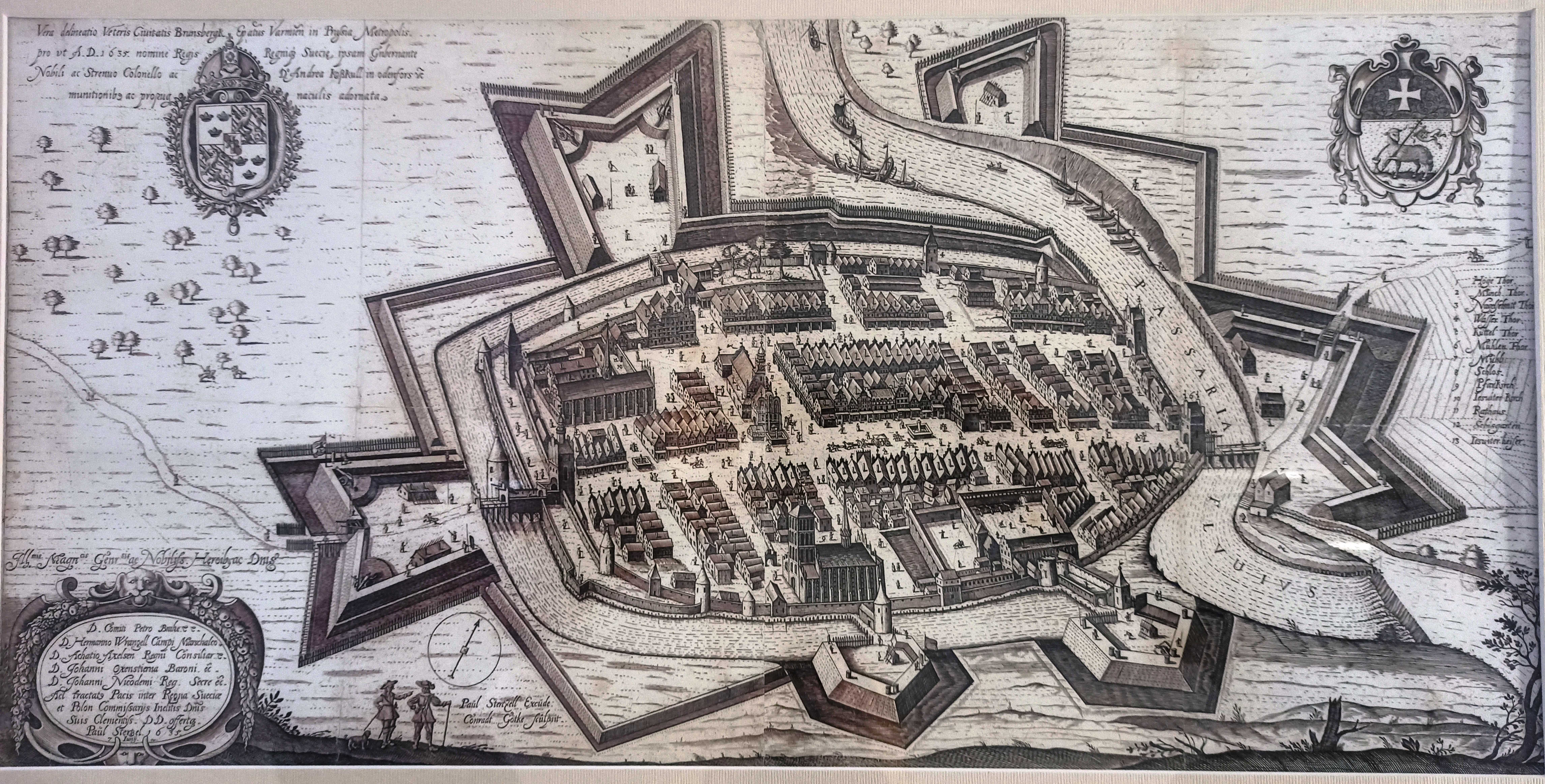
The oldest known city map of Braniewo, from 1635

Braniewo was occupied by Sweden for about three years during the Livonian War in the 16th century. In Warmia, Lutheran teachings again were suppressed when Prince-Bishop Stanislaus Hosius (1504–1579) brought in the Jesuits and founded the Collegium Hosianum school. Among the students of the school were Polish Catholic Saint Andrew Bobola, Polish statesmen and high dignitaries Mikołaj Zebrzydowski and Piotr Gembicki, Europe's most prominent 17th-century Latin poet Maciej Kazimierz Sarbiewski, missionary, explorer, mathematician, astronomer and sinologist Jan Mikołaj Smogulecki, and Primate of Poland Gabriel Podoski. Prominent Hungarian Renaissance poet Bálint Balassi stayed in the town in 1590–1591. A priestly seminary was added in 1564. Pope Gregory XIII later added a papal mission seminary for northern and eastern European countries. Regina Protmann (1552–1613), a native of Braunsberg (Braniewo), founded the Saint Catherine Order of Sisters in the town, recognized by the church in 1583. She was declared the patroness saint of Braniewo in 2002. The Jesuit theologian Antonius Possevinus was instrumental in enlarging the Collegium Hosianum in the 1580s to counter the growing Protestant movement. The college's library, including the works of Nicolaus Copernicus, was looted by the Swedes in 1626 and is still housed in the Uppsala University Library.

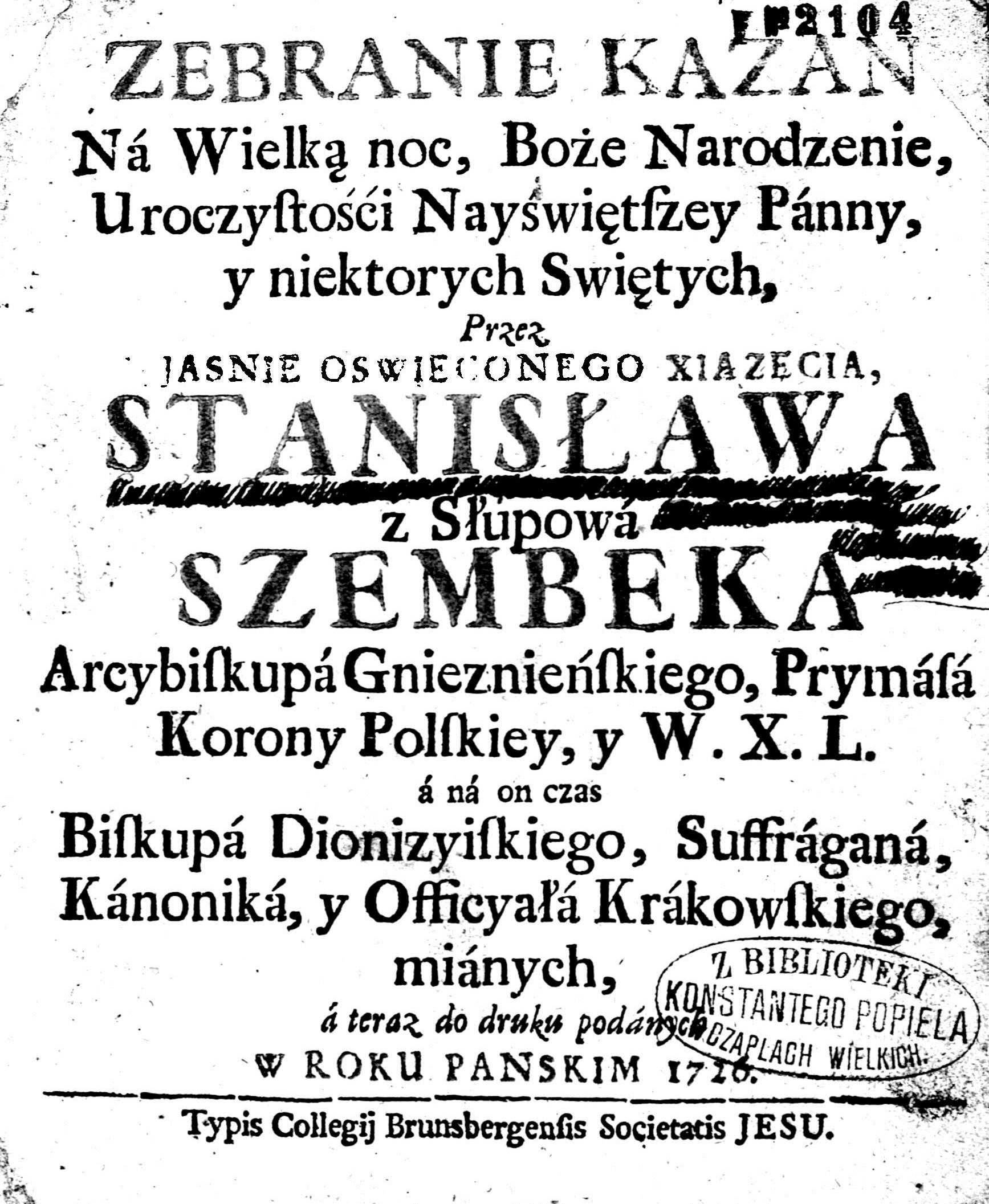
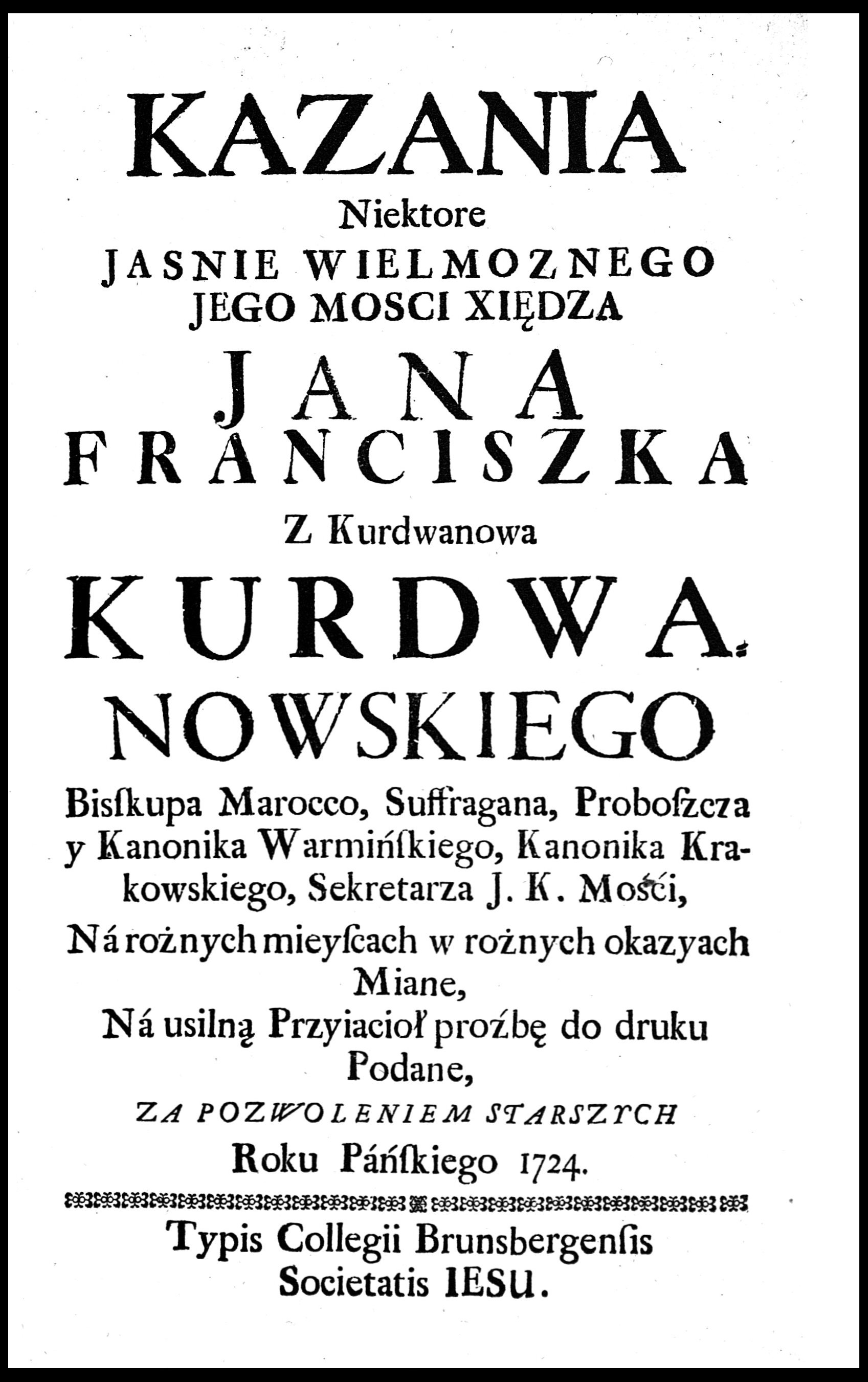
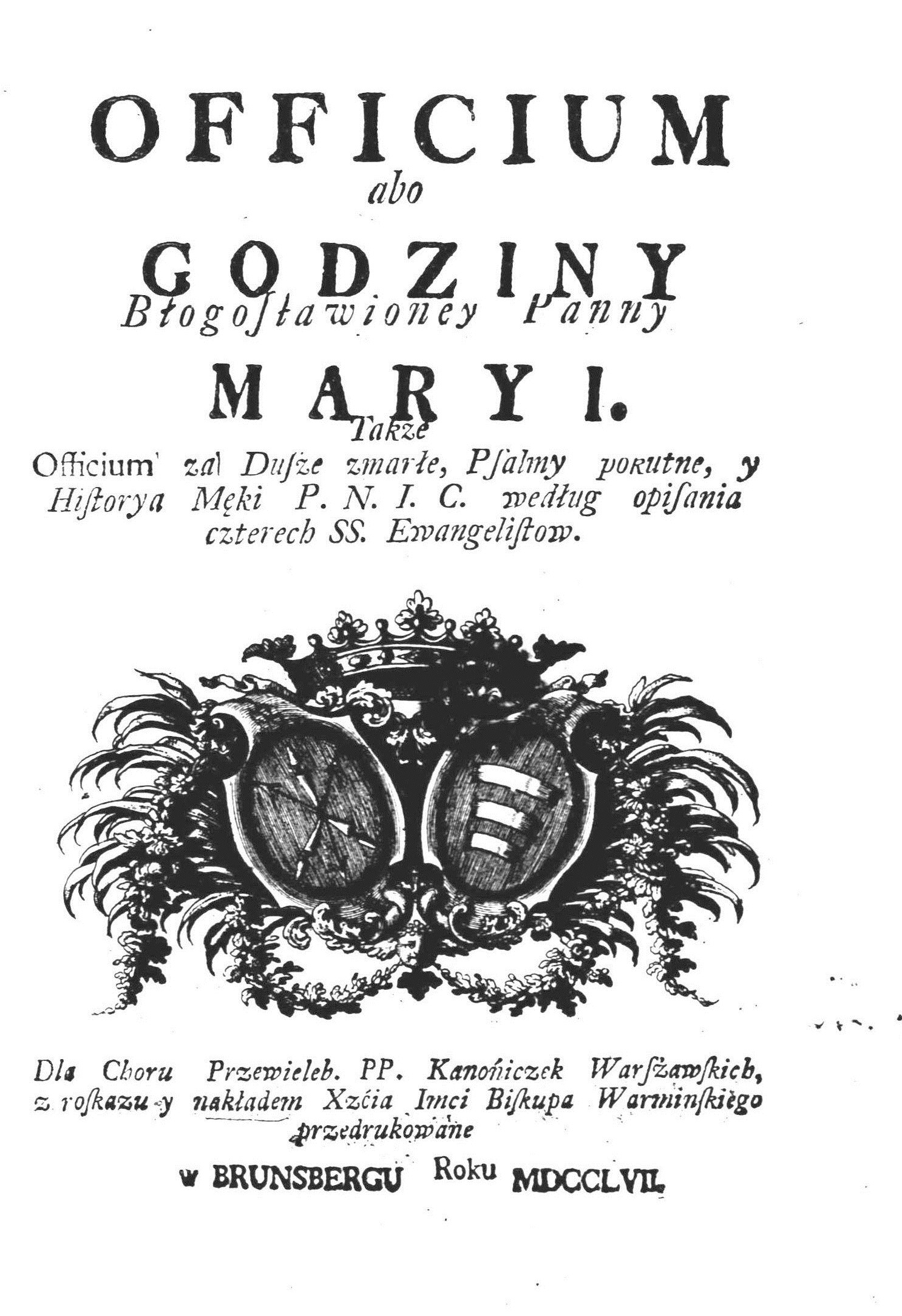
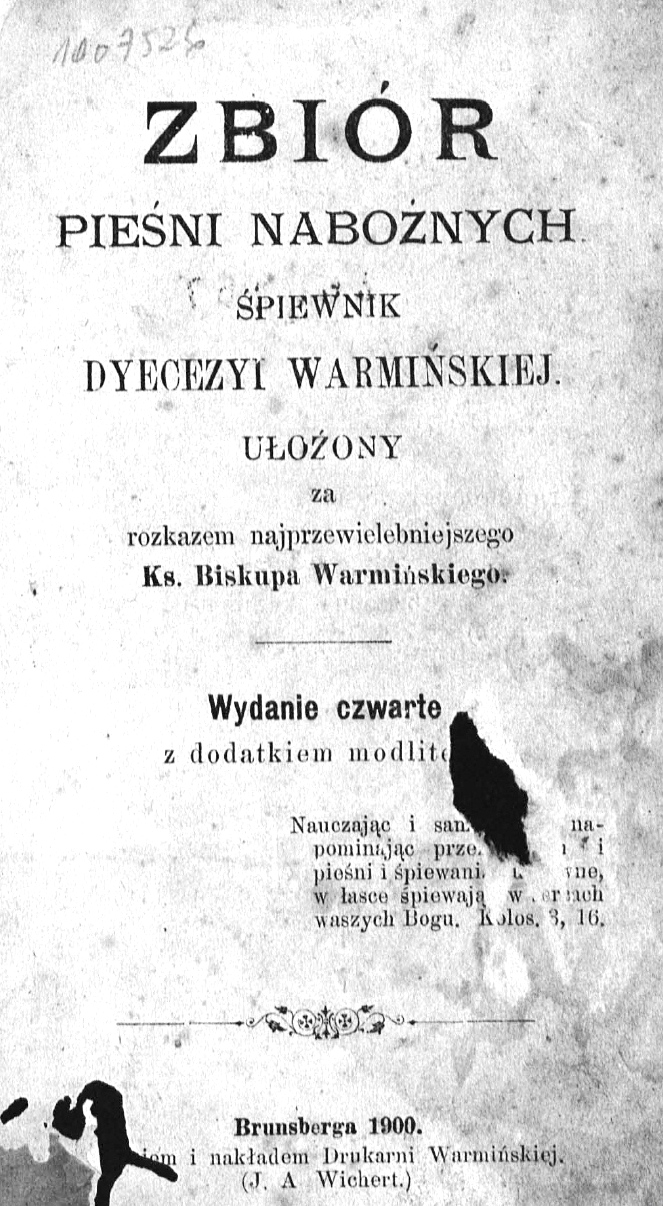
Polish Catholic publications from 1716–1900

Local brewing traditions date back to the 16th century, with the local beer being called the "best beer in Warmia" since the turn of the 16th and 17th centuries.

Braunsberg was annexed by the Kingdom of Prussia in 1772 during the First Partition of Poland and made part of the newly formed province of East Prussia the following year.

=== 19th and 20th centuries ===
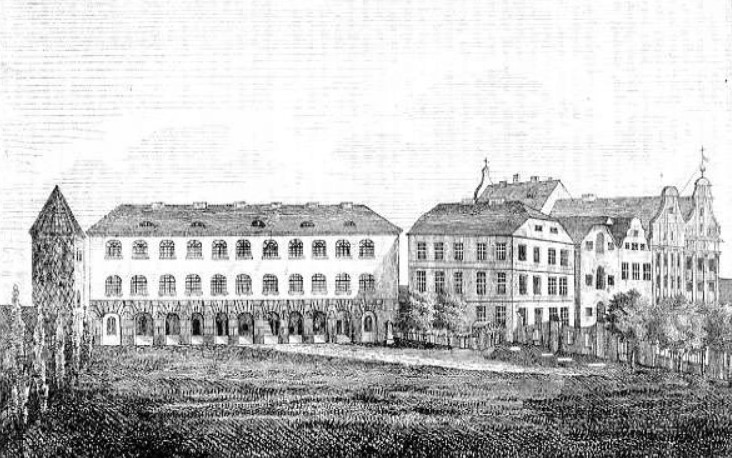
Collegium Hosianum in the 1840s

In 1812 Napoleon stopped in the town. From 1834 to 1849, an astronomical and meteorological observatory operated at the college. Braunsberg obtained its first railway connection with the rest of the kingdom via the Prussian Eastern Railway in 1852. In the early 20th century, the town was the leading academic center of East Prussia next to Königsberg. In 1912 the Jesuit college became the State Academy of Braunsberg (German: Staatliche Akademie Braunsberg). Prior to World War II, the population of Braunsberg had grown to more than 21,000, of whom 59 percent were listed as Catholic and 29 percent Protestant.

The Second World War turned much of the town into ruins. After three and a half years of savage warfare, Soviet forces began their assault on German land by attacking East Prussia on Jan. 13, 1945. Red Army formations reached the Vistula Lagoon north of Braunsberg on Jan. 26. In early February, German civilians began fleeing from Braunsberg across the ice of the frozen lagoon to the Vistula Spit, from which many journeyed to either Danzig (Gdańsk) or Pillau (Baltiysk), and managed to board German ships that made the perilous voyage westward. Braunsberg was captured by Soviet troops on March 20, 1945.

After capturing the town, Soviet soldiers executed 15 local nuns. The nuns were beautified by Pope Leo XIV on 31 May 2025.

Historic architecture of Braniewo (examples)

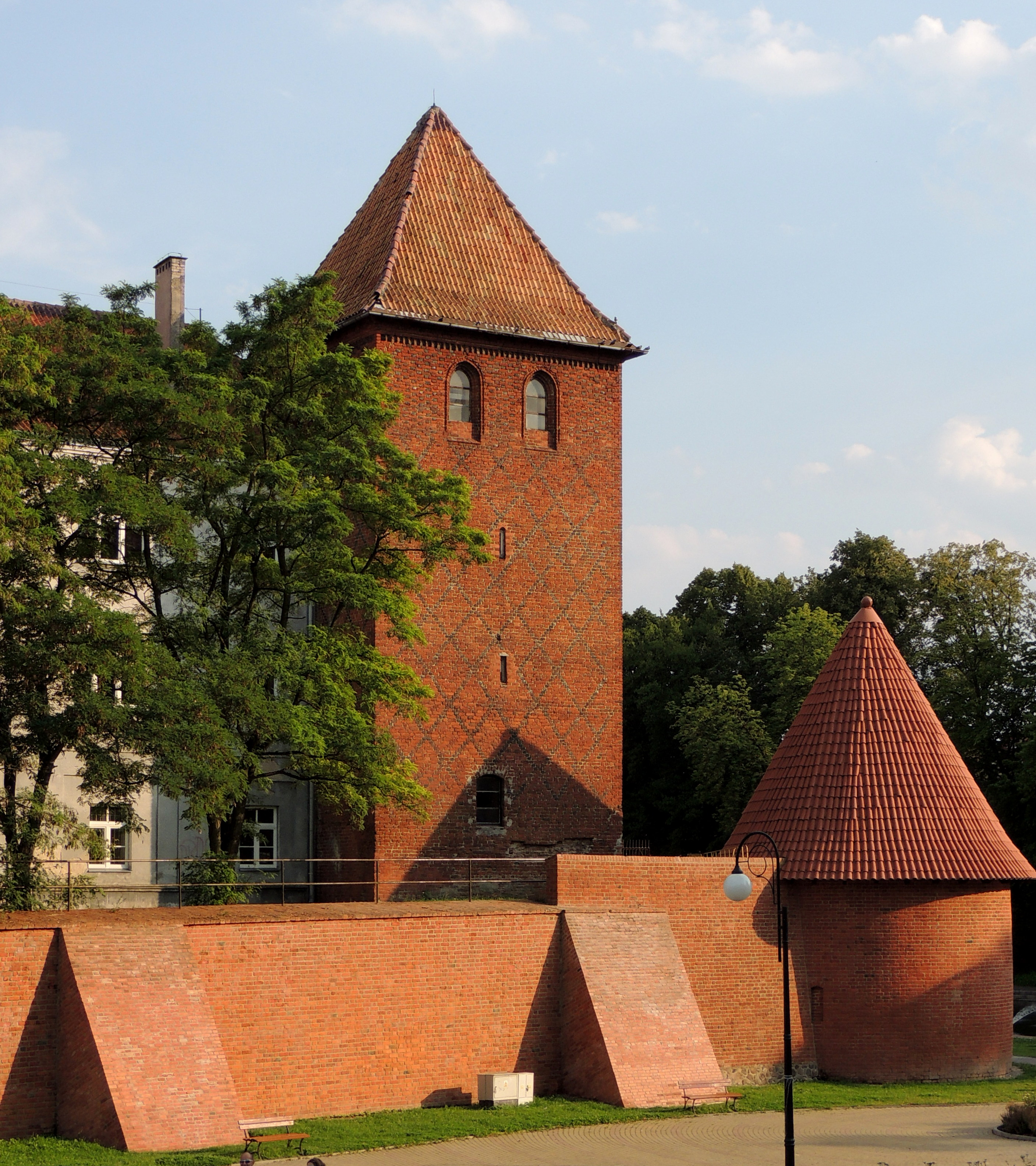
Defensive walls and towers

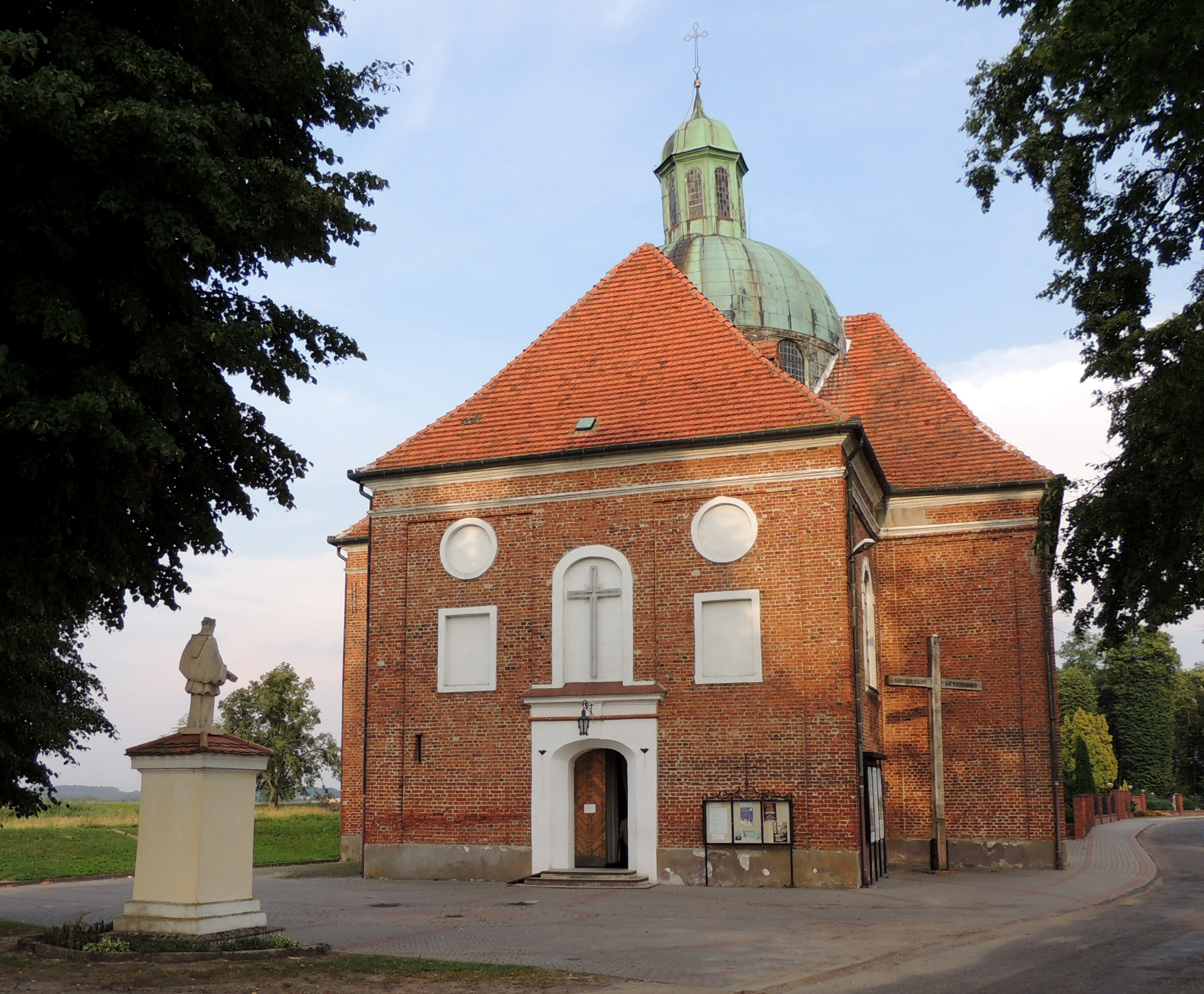
Holy Cross Sanctuary

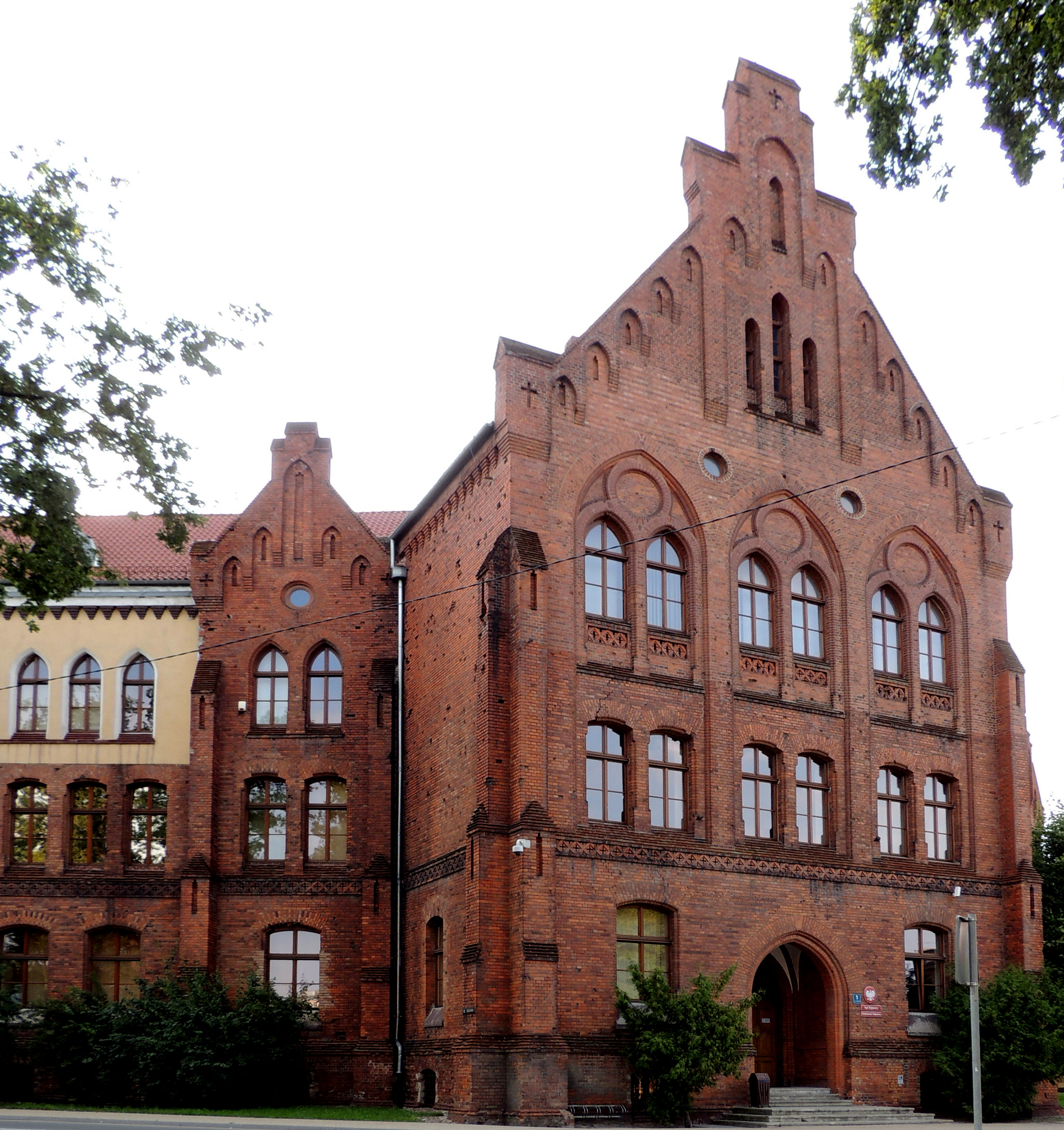
Courthouse

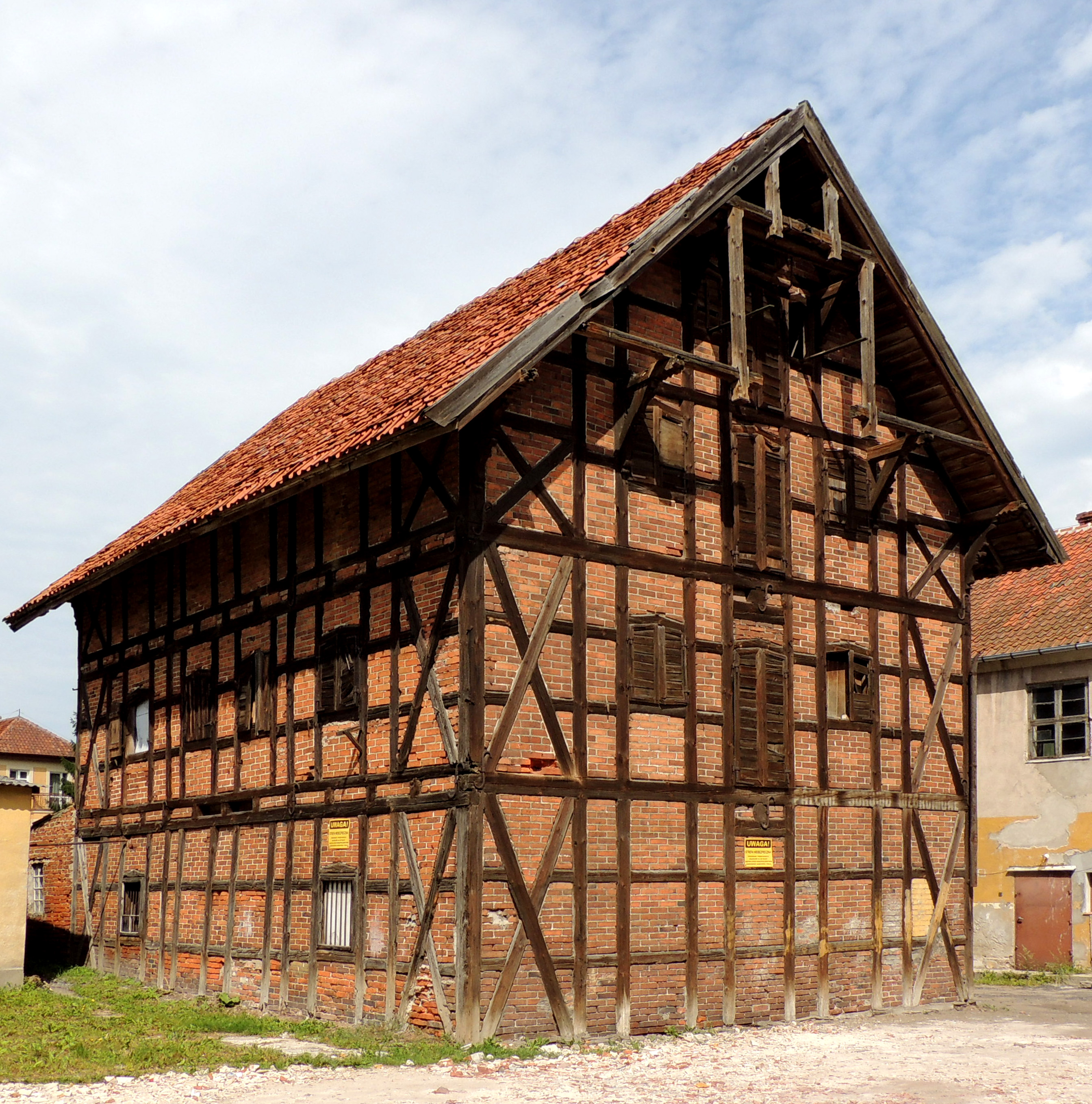
Old granary

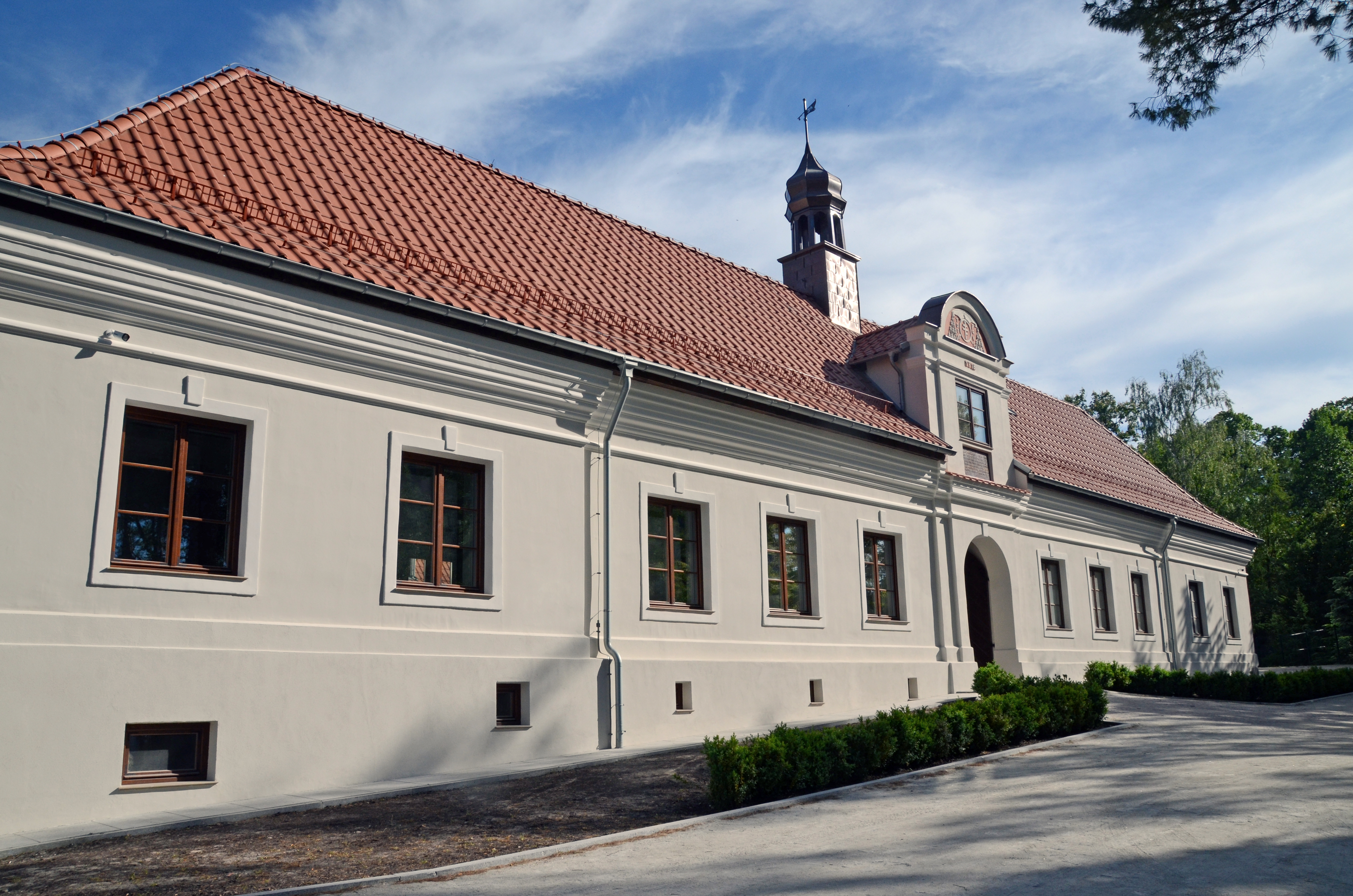
Baroque Potocki Palace

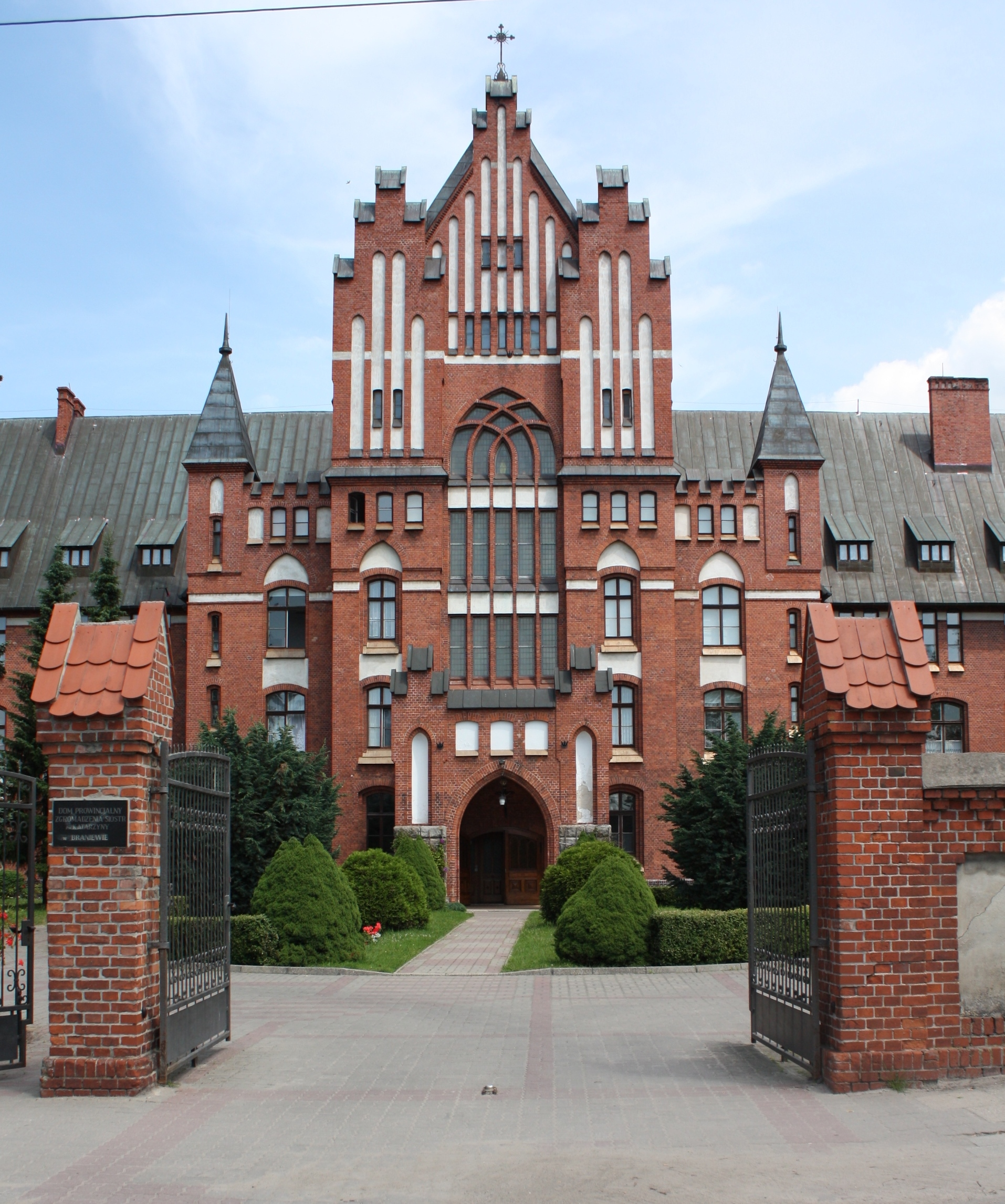
Monastery of Saint Catherine

Heavy fighting and wanton destruction afterwards had left the town about 80 percent destroyed, including much of its historic town center, largely consumed by fire. After the German surrender, sovereignty over the town was ceremoniously transferred to Polish authorities on July 7.

The previous unilateral Soviet transfer of power to Poland was accepted according to the Potsdam Agreement, however, under preliminary terms. The town was partially repopulated by Polish settlers, many of whom came from areas of eastern Poland annexed by the Soviet Union.

After the war, mineral water production began in the former brewery. Following reconstruction, the local brewery was reopened in 1965.

In 2001 the St. Catherine Church, built in 1346, destroyed in 1945, and rebuilt after 1979, was declared a Basilica Minor. This Gothic Hall church was built on a site which had held a previous wooden Church of St. Catherine since 1280. Prince-Bishop Lucas Watzenrode of Warmia (1447–1512) had added extensively to the original building.

=== Number of inhabitants by year ===
Historical population

Year	Pop.	±%
1782	4,370	—
1831	7,144	+63.5%
1843	9,018	+26.2%
1880	11,542	+28.0%
1890	10,851	−6.0%
1900	12,497	+15.2%
1910	13,601	+8.8%

Year	Pop.	±%
1925	13,893	+2.1%
1939	21,142	+52.2%
1950	5,741	−72.8%
1960	9,758	+70.0%
2004	18,068	+85.2%
2021	16,907	−6.4%

== Economy ==
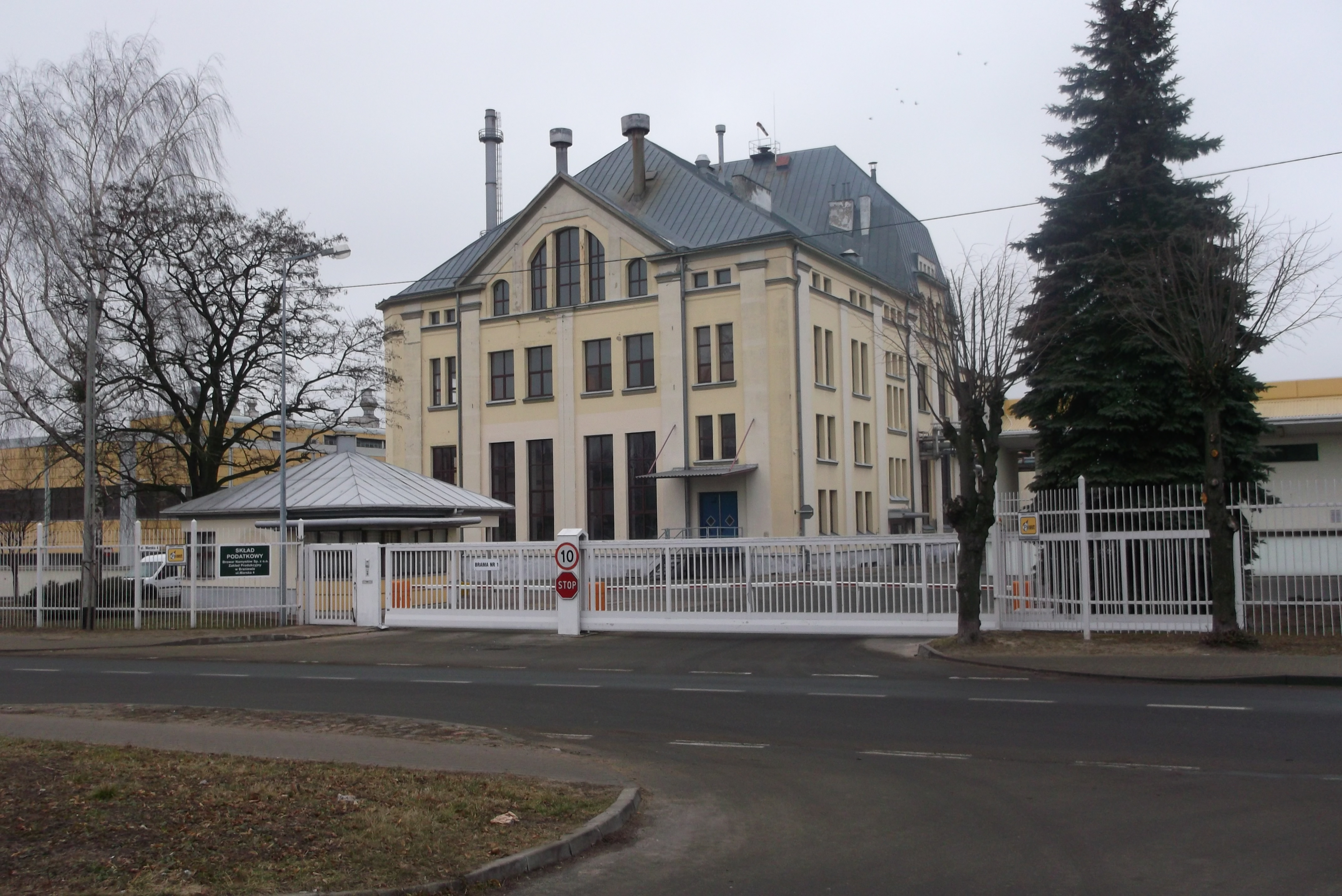
Braniewo Brewery

The Browar Braniewo ("Braniewo Brewery") is located in the town.

== Sports ==
The local football team is Zatoka Braniewo, which competes in the lower leagues.

== Notable residents ==
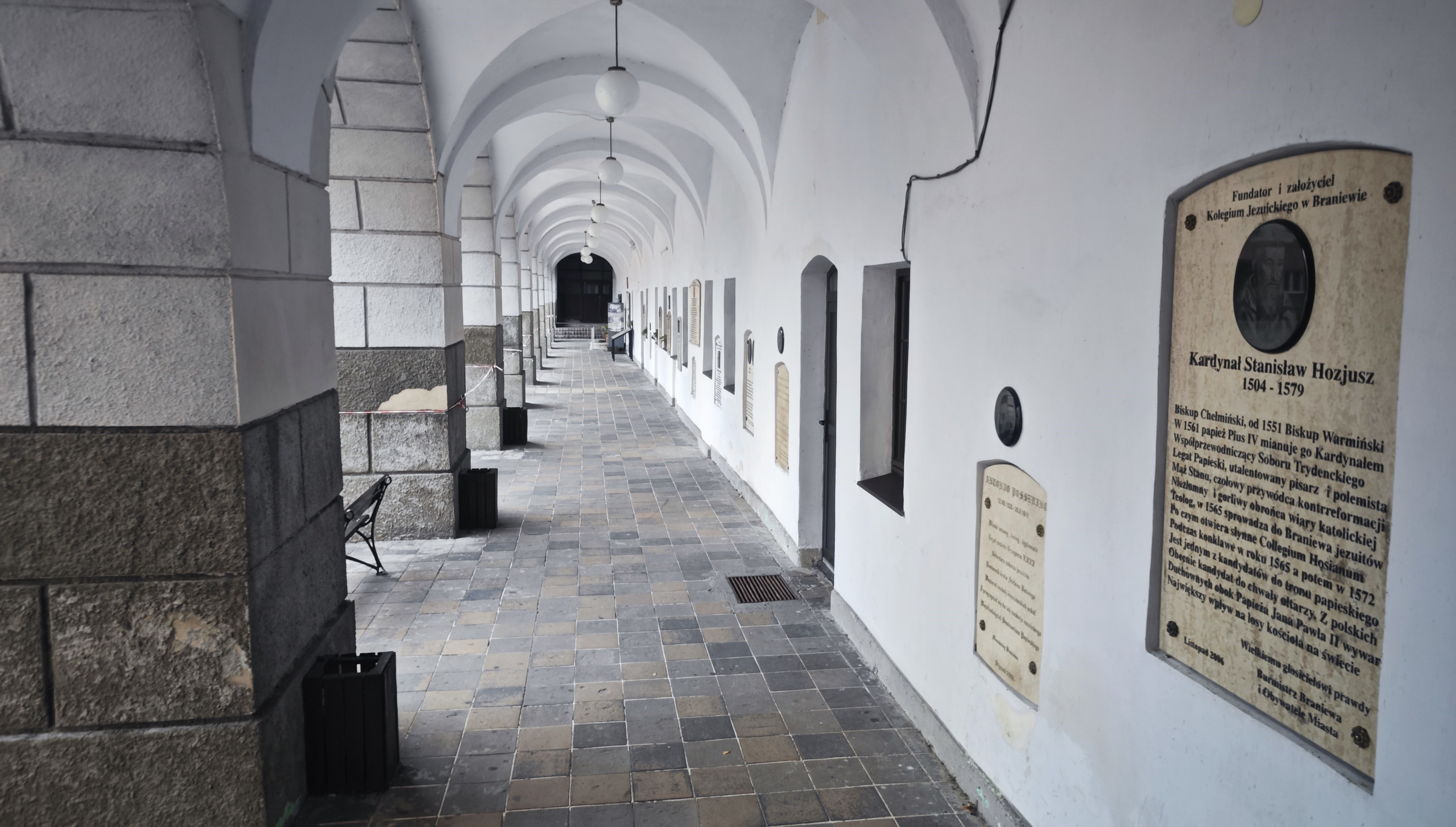
Hallway at Collegium Hosianum with memorial plaques to the founder and famous lecturers and students

- Stanislaus Hosius (1504–1579), Polish Catholic cardinal, prince-bishop, founder of the Collegium Hosianum
- Regina Protmann (1522–1613), Polish Catholic nun, charity pioneer.
- Andrew Bobola (1591–1657), Polish missionary, martyr and Catholic saint.
- August Willich (1810–1878), German politician and general.
- Karl Weierstrass (1815–1897), German mathematician.
- Gustavus von Tempsky (1828–1868), German newspaper correspondent and soldier.
- Elimar Klebs (1852–1918), German historian
- Samuel Oppenheim (1857–1928), Austrian astronomer.
- Konrad Zuse (1910–1995), German civil engineer, inventor and computer pioneer.
- Rainer Barzel (1924–2006), German politician (Christian Democratic Union).
- Hartmut Bagger (1938–2024), German Army General
- Bartosz Białkowski (born 1987), Polish footballer (soccer player) on several British teams.
- Tomasz Ptak (born 1992), Polish footballer for Zatoka Braniewo

== Twin towns – sister cities ==
Braniewo is twinned with:

- Münster, Germany
- (Czech Republic) Nošovice, Czech Rep.

Former twin towns:

- Zelenogradsk, Russia

In March 2022, Braniewo terminated its partnership with the Russian city of Zelenogradsk as a reaction to the 2022 Russian invasion of Ukraine.
