= Portrait of Georg Giese =

Painting by Hans Holbein the Younger

- Artist: Hans Holbein, the younger
- Year: 1532
- Medium: oil on wood
- Dimensions: 86 cm × 96 cm (34 in × 38 in)
- Location: Gemäldegalerie, Berlin

Portrait of Georg Giese is a 1532 portrait by Hans Holbein the Younger, now in the Gemäldegalerie, Berlin. It is one of a series of portraits of wealthy Hanseatic merchants made by Holbein in the 1530s. This series of portraits signals the increasing importance of the emerging merchant class, as they took their place on a world stage.

== Background ==
In the 1530s, the artist Hans Holbein the Younger was commissioned to paint portraits of wealthy members of Hanseatic merchant families who were stationed at their family offices in London's Steelyard. Hans Holbein, the younger painted a series of eight portraits of individual merchants from the Steelyard. These portraits included Georg Giese of Danzig; Hans of Antwerp and Hermann Wedigh (all painted in 1532); Hillebrant Wedigh of Cologne; Unknown member of the Wedigh family; Dirk Tybis of Duisburg; Cyriacus Kale and Derick Born (all painted in 1533); Derick Berck (painted in 1536).

Merchant members of the Hanseatic League represented a new type of merchant class, that was beginning to dominate trade in 14th and 15th-century Europe. Rather than haul goods from one market town to another, as had been the practice throughout the Middle Ages, these new merchants dealt in goods on a large scale, importing and exporting across long distances. They took their place on a world stage, often maintaining permanent offices in the larger European or Asian cities, which were operated by agents or family members.

These merchants formed a fraternity of traders, known as the Hanseatic League, to control trade, remove trade restrictions and negotiate certain privileges for their members. In London, Hanseatic merchants congregated at London's Steelyard where they enjoyed some protection and received exemptions from certain taxes and customs duties. The Steelyard, so named because of the weighing scales that had been housed there, was a walled enclosure on the North bank of the Thames, near London Bridge. Goods arriving by sea could be directly unloaded into the warehouses at the Steelyard. In addition to offices and warehouses, the Steelyard also included residences for the merchants, a guildhall, cloth halls, wine cellars and kitchens. In effect, the Steelyard was a separate and independent community, governed by the codes of the Hanseatic League, and enforced by the merchants' native cities.

By the 16th-century, it had become a habit for wealthier merchants, with the means to commission artworks, to have paintings of themselves, either with or without their families, made. Thus, merchants and merchant classes became important subject matter and source of income for artists.

== The sitter: Georg Giese ==
Georg Giese, one of the younger sons of Albrecht Giese and his wife, Elisabeth Langenbeck, was born in Danzig (Gdańsk) in 1497. His paternal family were wealthy merchants who had emigrated from Cologne in the 1430s. His father was the mayor of Danzig, and his mother's uncle had also been the mayor of Danzig. He had at least six older siblings, whose names are not entirely clear. Tiedemann Giese, who became the Bishop of Culm (Chełmno), was an older brother.

Documentary sources suggest that Giese worked at the family's London branch in the 1520s and 1530s, for at least 12 years. He may originally have assisted an older brother, Francis. At the time when the portrait was commissioned, he may have been engaged to marry. Three years after the portrait was completed, he returned to his home city of Danzig, to marry Christine Krüger, the daughter of a prominent Danzig merchant, Tiedemann Krüger and grand-daughter of the Mayor of Thorn (Toruń). Giese died in February, 1562.

== The painting ==
The painting of Giese was commissioned and painted whilst the subject was stationed at the London branch of the Hanse on 1532. Scholars generally agree that this was the first portrait that Holbein painted after his return to England. The subject of the painting is clearly Georg Giese, identified by the various inscriptions of his name depicted in the painting. His occupation, that of merchant, is clearly seen by his clothing and tools of trade.

The symbolism evident in the painting has been the subject of considerable scholarly enquiry. A summary of the symbols, and their probable meanings has been provided by Holman:

Carnations in the vase (lower left): Carnations were a traditional symbol of an engagement or betrothal.
Rosemary (in vase, lower left): Rosemary is a herb that symbolises friendship or remembrance
Basil (in vase, lower left): Basil is a herb that symbolises protection from disease; may be an oblique reference to the Plague which affected the city at the time
Plaque (depicted over Giese's head): identifies the subject, and states that he is in his 34th year, in 1532.
Correspondence (in Giese's hand): A letter from his brother, written in Middle Saxon ("Middle Low German"): "Dem Erszamen/Jorgen gisze to lunden/in engelant mynem/broder to handen" ("To be handed to my brother, the honourable Jorgen gisze at London in England") signifies his connections to the family.
Other correspondence and sealing strips (on the wall, on desk, in multiple locations): Correspondence is emphasised in the painting. It features various pieces of correspondence from other merchant families in Northern Europe, who speak different languages and may signal a network of important trade connections. The letters use different spellings of Giese's name: "Georg Gisze", "Georg Giese" and "Georg Gyse."
Clock (on the desk): A clock reminds the owner of the passage of time; it may signal that Giese's time is valuable
Giese's personal motto (on the office wall): The motto reads as "Nulla sine merore voluptas" (No joy without sorrow) may allude the transitory nature of his occupation or his situation in London
Giese's family seal (on desk, lower left): A collection of merchant's marks on seals; a symbol that would be understood by members of the Hanseatic community and important traders, and identifies the family as merchants

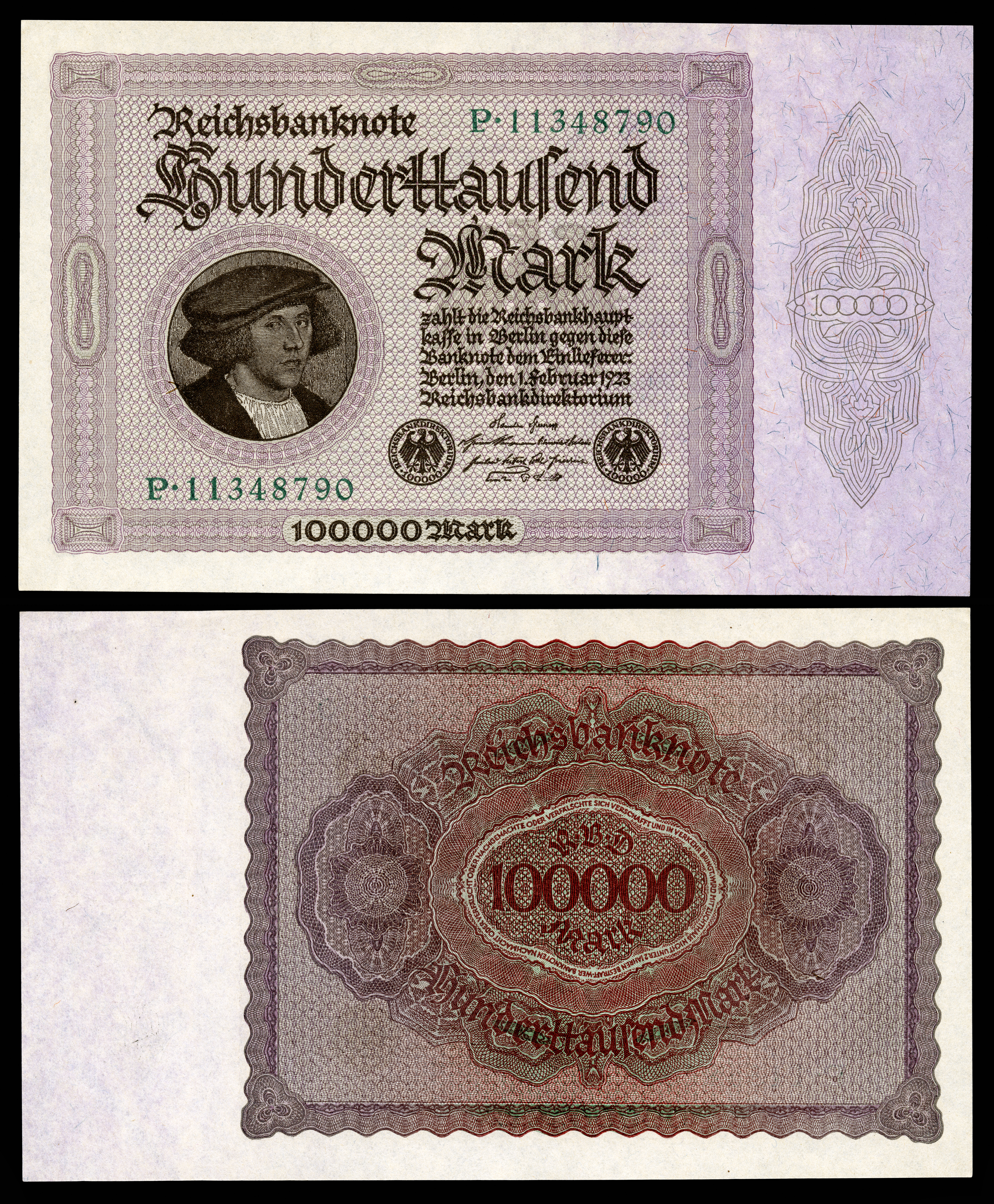
Giese's portrait was depicted on the 100,000 mark banknote of 1923.

Giese's portrait was depicted on the 100,000 mark banknote of 1923 (pictured).

== See also ==
- Merchant
- Commerce
- List of paintings by Hans Holbein the Younger
