= Deutsche Rentenbank =

The Deutsche Rentenbank was a bank established in Germany by a regulation of 15 October 1923 as a state-owned monetary authority authorised to issue Rentenmark currency notes following the collapse of the private Reichsbank's Papiermark currency. The Rentenbank reserves consisted of mortgages against leading industrial properties and the German public accepted these reserves as being sound. This meant that the monetary crisis caused by the public's lack of confidence in the currency of the Reichsbank waned and the hyperinflation ceased. The Rentenmarks continued to be accepted as currency in Germany until 1947.

== See also ==
- List of banks in Germany
