= Giesecke =

Giesecke may refer to:

People:

- Heinz-Eberhard Giesecke (1913–1991), German historian
- Karl Ludwig Giesecke FRSE (1761–1833), German actor, librettist, polar explorer and mineralogist
- Markus Giesecke (born 1979), German futsal player from Regensburg
- Albert Giesecke (1883-1968), American professor

Businesses:

- Giesecke & Devrient (G&D), German company that prints banknotes and securities, smart cards, etc.
- Schelter & Giesecke Type Foundry, German type foundry & manufacturer of printing presses started in 1819 in Leipzig

Geography:

- Giesecke Glacier, a glacier in Avannaata municipality in northwestern Greenland
- Giesecke Isfjord, a fjord in Avannaata municipality in northwestern Greenland

== See also ==
- Geseke
- Giese
- Giske
