= Giese =

Giese is a German surname. Since the mid-19th century, people with this name have migrated throughout the world and now form an extensive diaspora in countries such as the United States and Australia, where they have lived for several generations.

Notable people with the surname Giese include:

- Albrecht Giese (1524–1580), councilman and diplomat from Danzig
- Bernd Giese (born 1940), German professor of chemistry
- Dan Giese (born 1977), American retired Major League Baseball pitcher
- Erich Giese (1887–1917), German naval officer
- Georg Giese (1497–1562), merchant from Danzig
- Godehard Giese (born 1972), German actor
- Harry Giese (1903–1991), German theatre and voice actor
- Harry C. Giese (1913–2000), Australian administrator, public servant and community leader
- Horst Giese (1926–2008), East German actor
- Jeanna Giese, American rabies survivor
- Karl Giese (1898–1938), German archivist and museum curator
- Kathrin Giese, East German sprint canoer who competed in the 1980s
- Kenyon E. Giese (1933–1975), American politician
- Maria Giese, American film director and screenwriter
- Max Giese (1879–1935), German engineer and inventor
- Richard Giese (1924–2010), principal flautist with the New Zealand Symphony Orchestra (1962–1986)
- Richard Mclean Giese, known professionally as Social Repose, American Singer and YouTuber
- Robert Giese (born 1955), American politician
- Sigrid Sophia Agatha de Torres von Giese (1923–2009), known professionally as Paraluman, Filipino actress
- Tiedemann Giese (1480–1550), Catholic bishop from Danzig, Prince-Bishop of Warmia
- Warren Giese (1924–2013), American politician and football coach
- William C. Giese (1886–1966), American politician and educator
