= Mauritius Ferber =

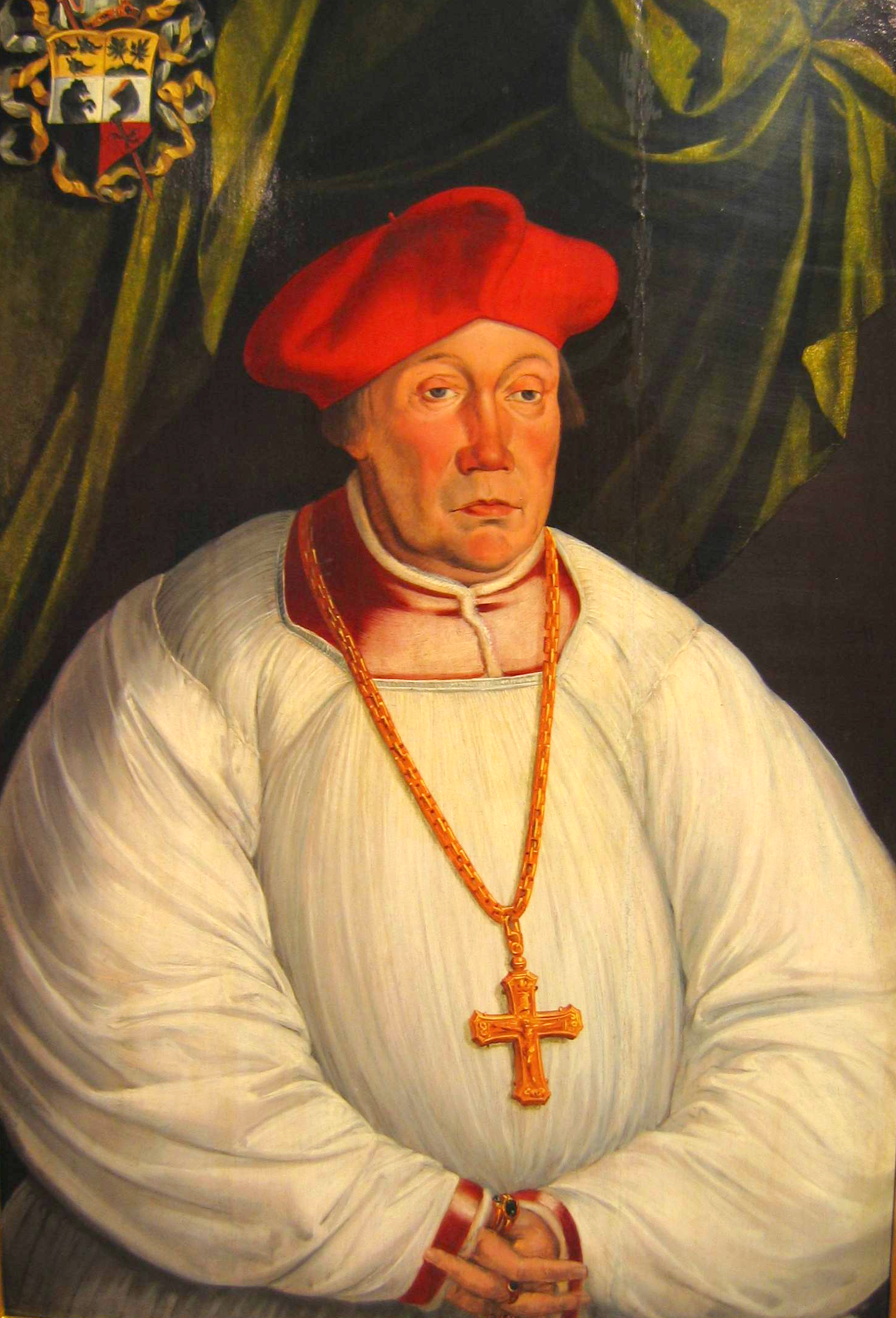
Portrait of Mauritius Ferber, by Anton Möller (1568–1611)

Mauritius Ferber (Polish: Maurycy Ferber; 1471 – 1 July 1537) was a member of the patrician Ferber family. As Roman Catholic Prince-Bishop of Warmia (Ermland), he prevented most towns in his diocese from converting to Protestantism while the surrounding hitherto Catholic State of the Teutonic Order was transformed into the Duchy of Prussia and became the first state to adopt Lutheranism.

== Life ==
The Ferber family had immigrated in 1415 from Kalkar to Danzig (Gdańsk). During four centuries, several members of the family served as mayor of Danzig, of which four served simultaneously. Johann Ferber was (nicknamed iron) mayor from 1479 until his death in 1501, his son Eberhard Ferber (1463–1529) served from 1510 until 1526, and Eberhard's son Konstantin Ferber (1520–1588) from 1555 until his death in 1588, with others of the name Constantin Ferber holding the office later on.

Mauritius Ferber was born in Danzig, in the Kingdom of Poland. He had stayed in England in 1497 before returning to his home town, where he in 1498 claimed to be engaged to Anna Pilemann, a wealthy heiress, by presenting parts of her clothes as proof. This led to a feud involving several families and to a lawsuit at the papal court. Mauritius successfully presented his case as plaintiff in Rome, but by that time the bride was married to someone else. In 1507, a compromise among the families was negotiated by Eberhard, while Mauritius spent time in Italy serving a cardinal and the pope before becoming a priest, as did Tiedemann Giese, another wealthy merchant from Danzig, and a relative of the Ferber family who would become Mauritius' coadjutor in 1523. He acquired several sinecures, became canon in Warmia, Lübeck, Reval and Dorpat, of St. Peter in Danzig in 1512 and of Danzig's (St. Mary's Church) in 1514. Back in Siena, on 3 September 1515 he was promoted to doctor of both laws.

In 1520, Mauritius and his brother Eberhard had to leave Danzig due to political conflicts of Eberhard. He sided with the King of Poland who nominated him in 1523 to the vacant seat of Prince-Bishop of Warmia. He was elected and started his administration in the fall of 1523 before being consecrated on 6 December. The diocese had suffered both by the administrator of his predecessor and by the Polish–Teutonic War (1519–1521). During peace talks in Cracow in 1525, he managed to defend the except bishopric against demands of both the Polish king and the former Teutonic Grandmaster who became the first Duke of Prussia. Until 1531, Ferber managed to improve the economic situation in his diocese as well as preventing towns from becoming Lutheran, with Elbląg (Elbing) being the exception to this rule.

== Illness and death ==
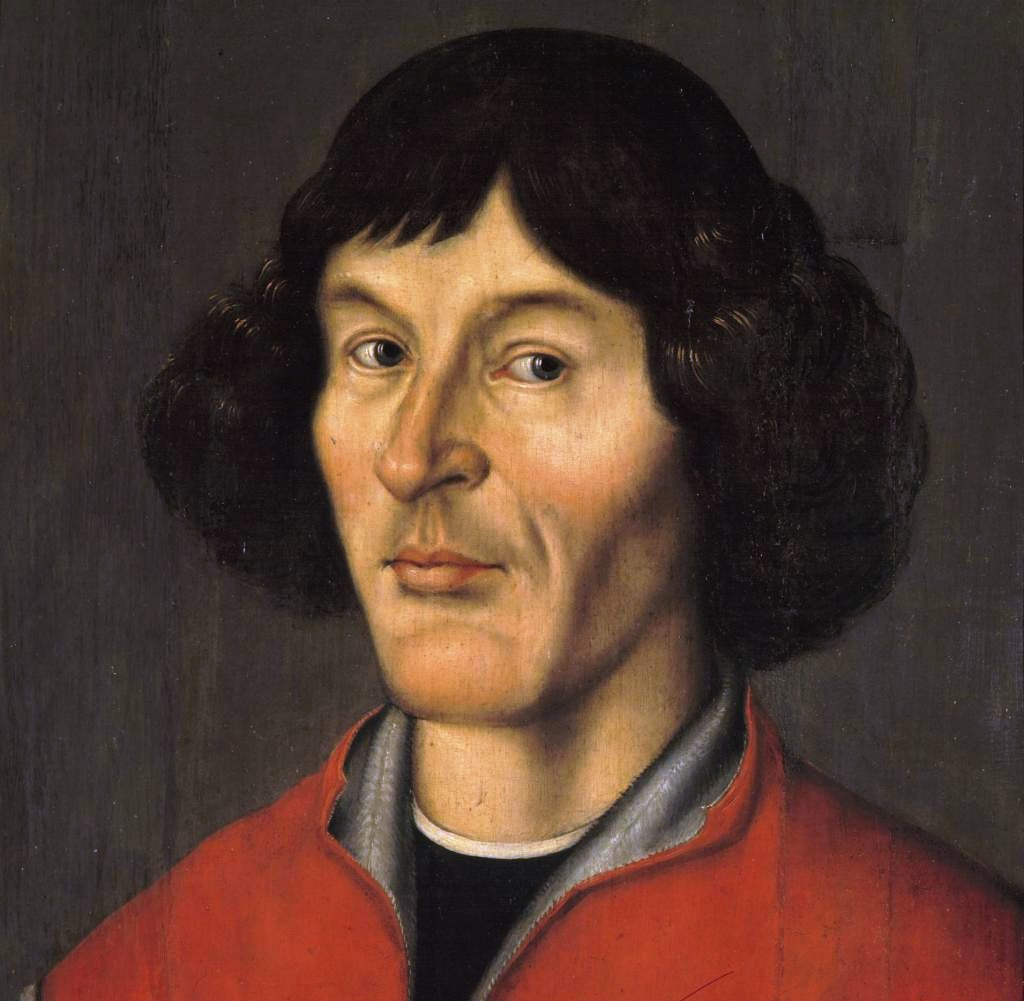
Nicolaus Copernicus

Near the end of 1531, Ferber was struck down by a severe illness and sought the help of Nicolaus Copernicus. By 29 December 1531, Copernicus had attended Ferber, as on that date Ferber wrote to Laurence Wille, physician to Albert, Duke of Prussia, describing his symptoms in terms set out for him by Copernicus. On 10 January 1532, Ferber asked Johannes Benedikt Solfa, physician to King Sigismund I of Poland, to send more medicines in case of a renewal of the illness "...which Doctor Nicolaus Copernicus and Doctor Wille are successfully fighting", and on 22 January 1532 he wrote to a priest in Kraków "Today Doctor Nicolaus Copernicus is treating our disease with the help of the art of medicine". On 24 April 1532, Ferber sent for Copernicus again, and the Chapter accounts for 1533 to 1534 note payments to Copernicus for herbs. Either on 23 February 1534 or 1 March 1535, Ferber suffered a cerebral stroke, which left him unable to speak, and Copernicus wrote a prescription which was approved by the king of Poland's physician. When Ferber suffered another stroke in 1537, Copernicus was immediately sent to Heilsberg (Lidzbark Warmiński), in Royal Prussia, but he arrived after Ferber's death there on 1 July.

As an executor of Ferber's will, Copernicus helped to make the funeral arrangements and an inventory of the bishop's belongings.

Shortly before his death, Johannes Dantiscus agreed to become Ferber's coadjutor, and he was eventually his successor.

Ferber is one of the figures on the Prussian Homage painting by Jan Matejko.

Catholic Church titles
Regnal titles
Preceded by Fabian von Lossainen	Prince-Bishop of Warmia (Ermland); 1523–1537	Succeeded by Johannes Dantiscus
