= Rentenmark =

German currency from 1923 to 1924

Rentenmark (German)
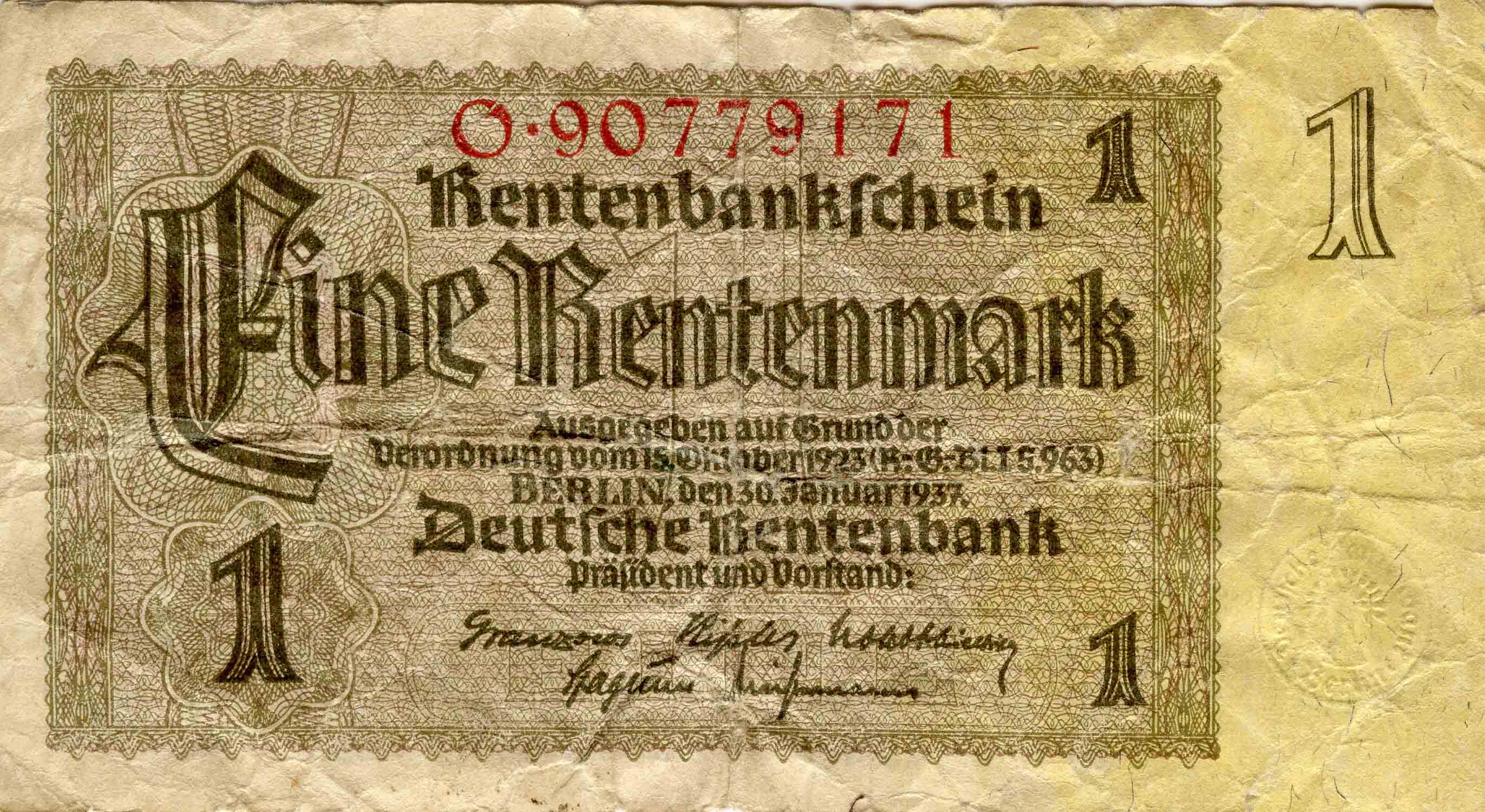
- One Rentenmark note

Units of account
- Plural: Rentenmark
- Symbol: RM
- Subunit
- 1/100: Rentenpfennig
- Plural
- Rentenpfennig: Rentenpfennig
- Symbol
- Rentenpfennig: Rpf.

Denominations
- Banknotes: RM 1, RM 2, RM 5, RM 10, RM 50, RM 100, RM 500, RM 1,000
- Coins: 1 Rpf, 2 Rpf, 5 Rpf, 10 Rpf, 50 Rpf

Demographics
- Replaced: Papiermark
- Replaced by: Reichsmark
- User(s): Germany

Issuance
- Central bank: Deutsche Rentenbank

Valuation
- Pegged with: United States dollar = RM 4.20, in turn 1,000,000,000,000ℳ = RM 1 (1 trillion short scale (US) or 1 billion long scale (UK pre-1974, Germany, much of Europe) = 1,000,000,000,000)
- This infobox shows the latest status before this currency was rendered obsolete.

The Rentenmark (German: [ˈʁɛntn̩ˌmaʁk]; RM) was a currency issued on 15 November 1923 to stop the hyperinflation of 1922 and 1923 in Weimar Germany, after the previously used Papiermark had become almost worthless. It was subdivided into 100 Rentenpfennig and was replaced in 1924 by the Reichsmark.

== History ==
After the Occupation of the Ruhr in early 1923 by French and Belgian troops, referred to as the Ruhrkampf, the German government of Wilhelm Cuno reacted by announcing a policy of passive resistance. This caused the regional economy of the Ruhr, the industrial heartland of Germany, to almost stop. The occupation authorities reacted to strikes and sabotage with arrests and deportations. Those displaced and left without income by the Ruhrkampf and their families fell back on public income support. Tax revenues plunged as economic activity slowed. The government covered its need for funds mainly by printing money. As a result, inflation spiked and the Papiermark went into freefall on the currency market. Foreign currency reserves at the Reichsbank dwindled.

As hyperinflation took hold, the cabinet of Cuno resigned in August 1923 and was replaced by the cabinet of Gustav Stresemann. After Stresemann reshuffled his cabinet in early October, Hans Luther became Minister of Finance. Luther quickly came up with a stabilization plan for the currency which combined elements of a monetary reform by economist Karl Helfferich with ideas of Luther's predecessor in office Rudolf Hilferding. With the help of the emergency law (Ermächtigungsgesetz) of 13 October 1923 which gave the government the power to issue decrees on financial and economic matters, the new Rentenbank was established that same day, 15 October 1923. To manage the introduction of a new currency outside the Reichsbank, Hjalmar Schacht was appointed to the new office of Currency Commissioner, with cabinet rank, on November 12.

The newly created Rentenmark was introduced alongside the old Papiermark on 15 November. Because of the economic crisis in Germany after the First World War, there was no gold available to back the currency. Luther thus used Helfferich's idea of a currency backed by real goods. The new currency was backed by the land used for agriculture and business. This was mortgaged (Rente is a technical term for mortgage in German) to the tune of 3.2 billion Goldmarks, based on the 1913 wealth charge called Wehrbeitrag which had helped fund the German war effort from 1914 to 1918. Notes worth RM 3.2 billion were issued. The conversion rate was set by Schacht on November 20 to a rate of one Rentenmark to equal one trillion (10^{12}) old marks, coinciding with an exchange rate of one United States dollar to equal 4.2 Rentenmarks, recalling the pre-war exchange rate of gold Marks to the U.S. Dollar. Von Havenstein, the head of the Reichsbank, died suddenly on November 20 and Schacht was appointed in his place one month later.

The Act creating the Rentenmark backed the currency by means of twice yearly payments on property, due in April and October, payable for five years. Although the Rentenmark was not initially legal tender, its total issue was rigidly fixed in quantity and it was accepted by the population and its value was relatively stable. The Act prohibited the Reichsbank from continuing to discount bills. Stresemann's government reinforced the Rentenmark with budgetary measures, balancing the budget by January 1924. The monetary policy spearheaded by Schacht at the Reichsbank and the fiscal policy of Finance Minister Hans Luther brought the period of hyperinflation in Germany to an end. The Reichsmark became the new legal tender on 30 August 1924, equal in value to the Rentenmark. This marked a return to a gold-backed currency in connection with the implementation of the Dawes Plan. The Rentenbank continued to exist after 1924 and the notes and coins continued to circulate. The last Rentenmark notes were valid until 1948.

== Coins ==
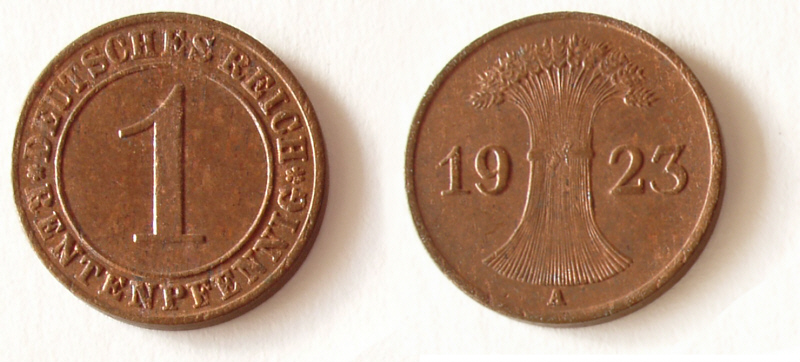
1 Rentenpfennig dated 1923

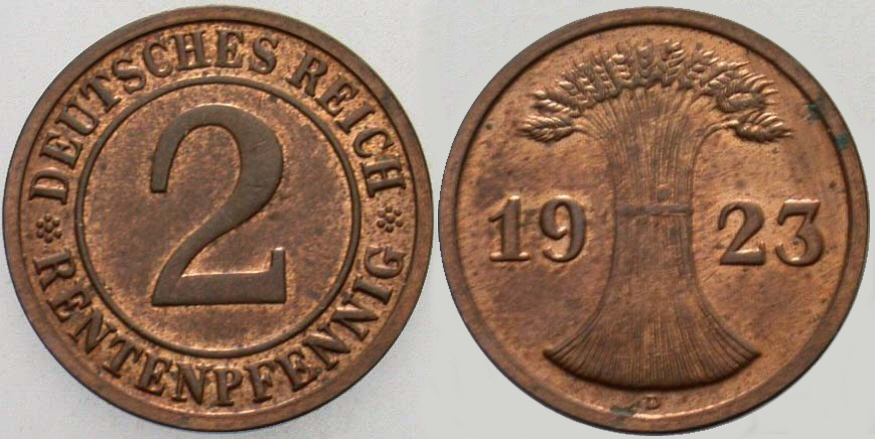
2 Rentenpfennig dated 1923

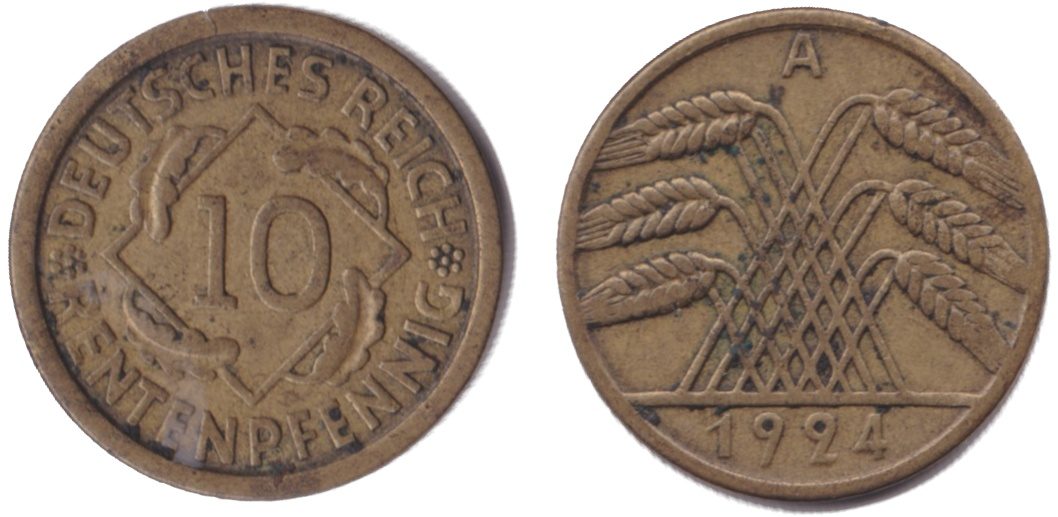
10 Rentenpfennig dated 1924

Coins were issued dated 1923, 1924 and 1925 in denominations of 1 Rpf, 2 Rpf, 5 Rpf, 10 Rpf and 50 Rpf. Only small numbers of Rentenpfennig coins were produced in 1925. A few 1 Rpf coins were struck dated 1929. The 1 Rpf and 2 Rpf were minted in bronze, with the 5 Rpf, 10 Rpf, and 50 Rpf coins in aluminium-bronze. These coins had the same design features and motifs as coins of the Reichsmark from the Weimar and early Third Reich periods.

== Banknotes ==
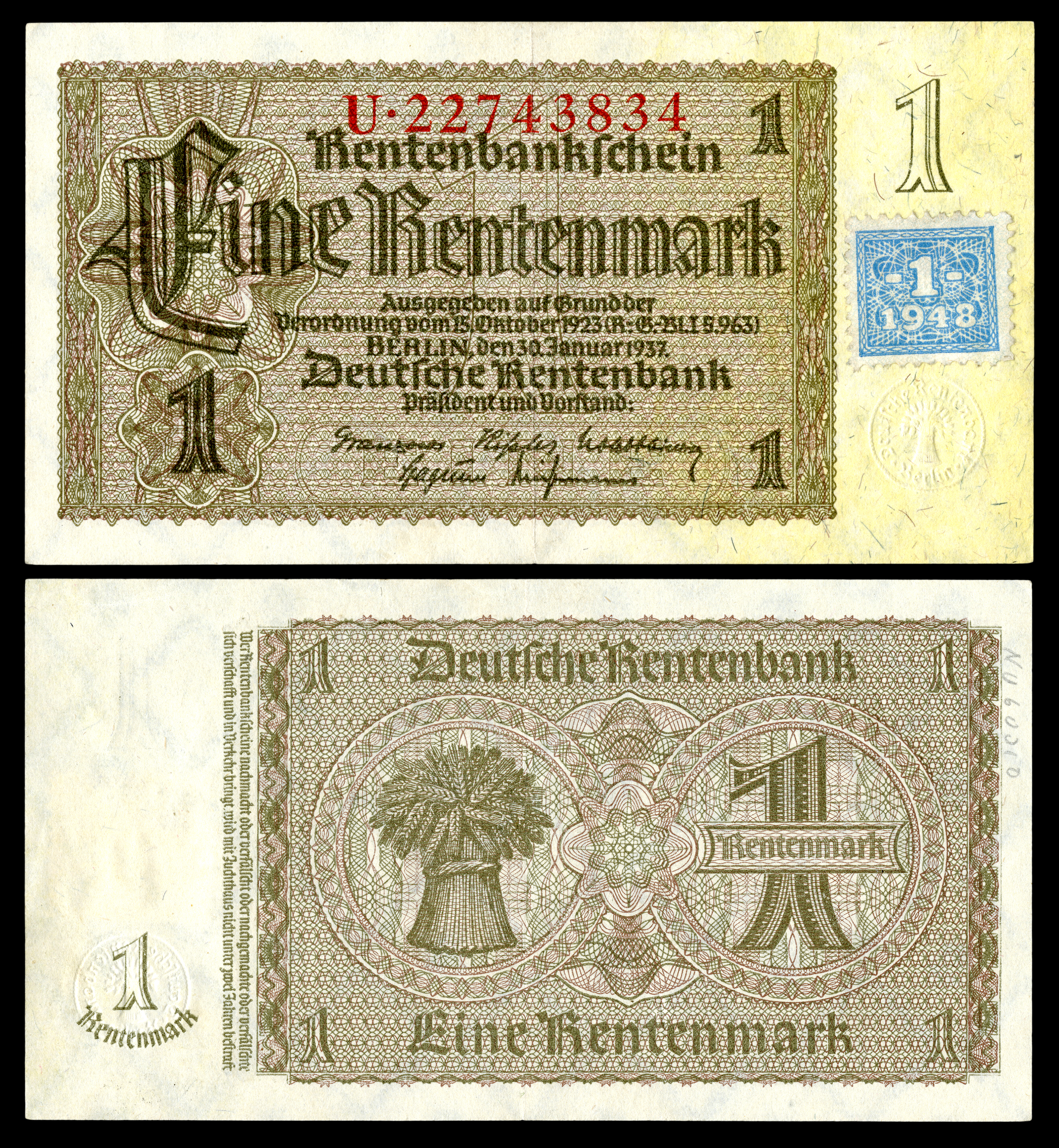
The first banknote of the East German Mark (1948), was a 1937 Rentenmark with a validation coupon stamp affixed.

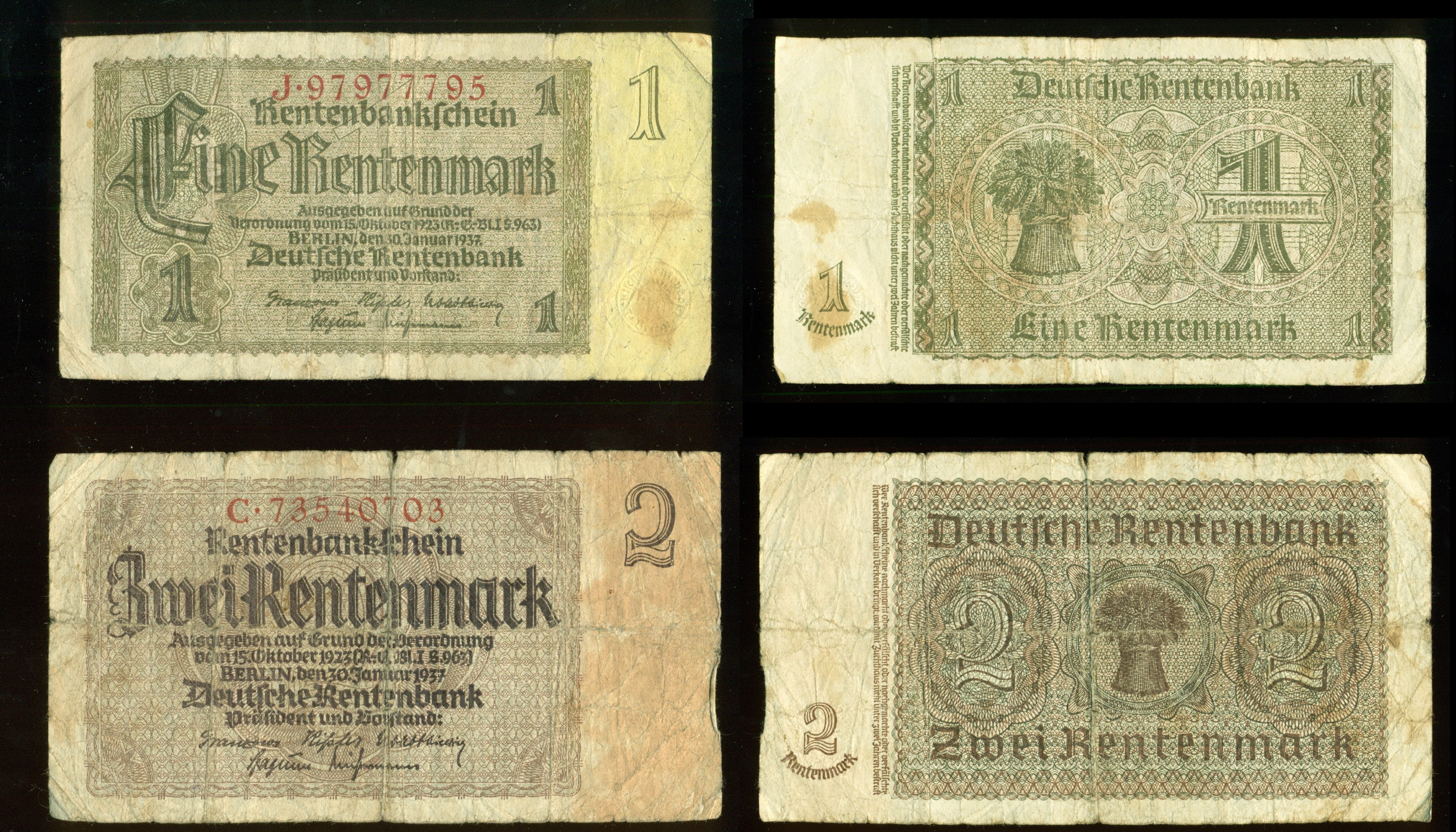
30 Januar 1937 – Banknotes of 1 and 2 Rentenmark, serial number with 8 digits

The first issue of banknotes was dated 1 November 1923 and was in denominations of RM 1, RM 2, RM 5, RM 10, RM 50, RM 100, RM 500 and RM 1000. Later issues of notes were RM 10 and RM 50 (1925), RM 5 (1926), RM 50 (1934) and RM 1 and RM 2 (1937).

== See also ==
- 1924 in Germany

Preceded by: Mark; Reason: inflation Ratio: 1 Rentenmark = 1,000,000,000,000 Papiermark, and 4.2 Rentenmark = US$1	Currency of Germany; 15 November 1923 – 29 August 1924	Circulates in Germany; 30 August 1924 – 1948; Note: Reichsmark was the legal tender	Succeeded by: East German mark Reason: reaction to the changeover in Trizone (later West Germany); Ratio: 1 Mark = 7 Rentenmark on the first 70 Rentenmark for private individuals, otherwise 1 Kuponmark = 10 Rentenmark
Preceded by: Mark; Reason: inflation Ratio: 1 Rentenmark = 1,000,000,000,000 Papiermark, and 4.2 Rentenmark = US$1	Currency of Germany; 15 November 1923 – 29 August 1924	Circulates in Germany; 30 August 1924 – 1948; Note: Reichsmark was the legal tender	Succeeded by: Deutsche Mark; Reason: intended to protect West Germany from the second wave of hyperinflation and stop the rampant barter and black market trade Ratio: 1 Deutsche Mark = 1 Rentenmark for first 600 RM, 1 Deutsche Mark = 10 Rentenmark thereafter, plus each person received 40 Deutsche Mark
