= Johannes Dantiscus =

Polish bishop, diplomat and poet

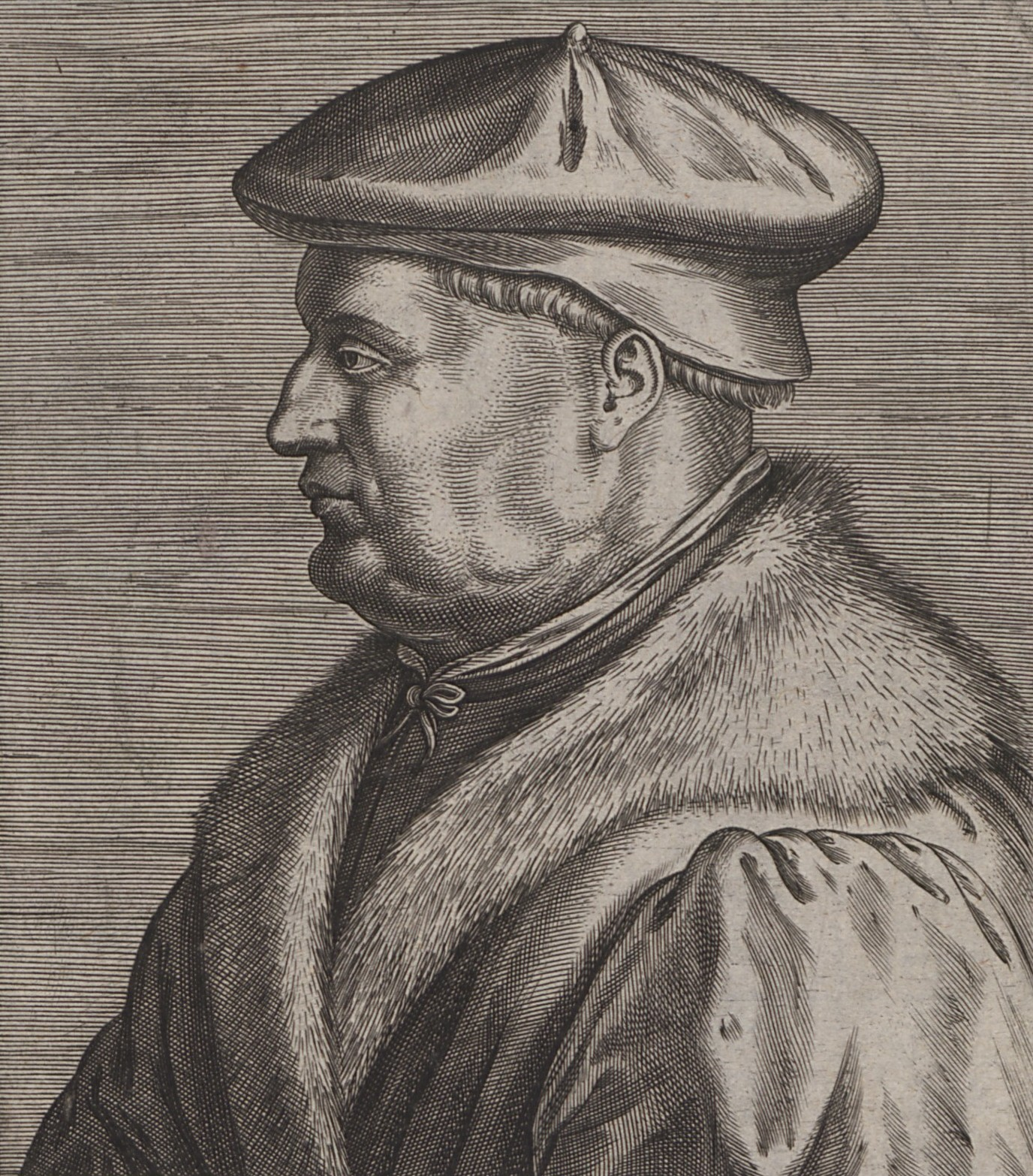
Joannes Dantiscus Episcopus Culmensis

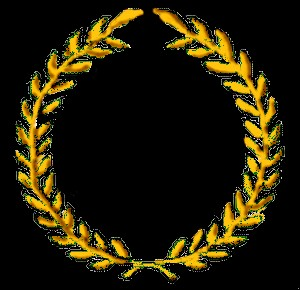
Poeta Laureatus

Johannes Dantiscus, (German: Johann(es) von Höfen-Flachsbinder; Polish: Jan Dantyszek; 1 November 1485 – 27 October 1548) was prince-bishop of Warmia and Bishop of Chełmno (Culm). In recognition of his diplomatic services for Polish kings, the bishop and poet is also known as the "Father of Polish Diplomacy."

Johannes Dantiscus' personal seal, a depiction located at Stanford University Libraries, identifies him as Ioannes De Curiis, Pruss. Varmien with St. Katherine, St. Jacob and St. Peter crests.

== Biography ==
Dantiscus was born in Danzig (Gdańsk), in the Kingdom of Poland. His family's name was von Höfen, while Flachsbinder was an occupational name derived from his grandfather's ropemaking trade (literally flax binder). Johannes took on the nickname Dantiscus in order to show that he was a burgher of Danzig (Latin: Dantiscum) where his father was a brewer and merchant.

He finished his elementary studies at a parish school in Grudziądz (Graudenz), and studied first in Greifswald, then in Kraków where he was awarded a bachelor's degree.

During his studies, the teenage Dantiscus became associated with the royal court of King John I Albert of Poland, and took part in military expeditions against the Turks and the Moldavians. For over 30 years he was a royal diplomat and the royal secretary.

Dantiscus, at King Sigismund I's side, took part in the Holy Roman Empire's convention of Vienna in 1515. In Vienna he was knighted by the emperor for his services and was made a nobleman.

Johannes became a church canon, then Bishop of Chełmno and later of Bishop of Warmia. He also wrote many poems, mainly in Latin, for which he is regarded as one of the most outstanding poets. Among his many works is his autobiography Vita Joannis de Curiis Dantisci ("The Life of Johannes of the Danzig Church"). He was granted Poetic Laurels by Maximalian I in 1516.

In addition, he maintained an active correspondence with prominent persons and institutions throughout Europe as well as with relatives. Thousands of his letters dating from 1500–1548 are still in existence. Dantiscus wrote mainly in Latin and German, and sporadically received letters in Polish, or in other languages.

He died, aged 63, in Lidzbark (Heilsberg).

Catholic Church titles
Regnal titles
Preceded by Mauritius Ferber	Prince-Bishop of Warmia (Ermland); 1537–1548	Succeeded by Tiedemann Giese
