= Papiermark =

German currency from 1914 to 1923

Mark (German)
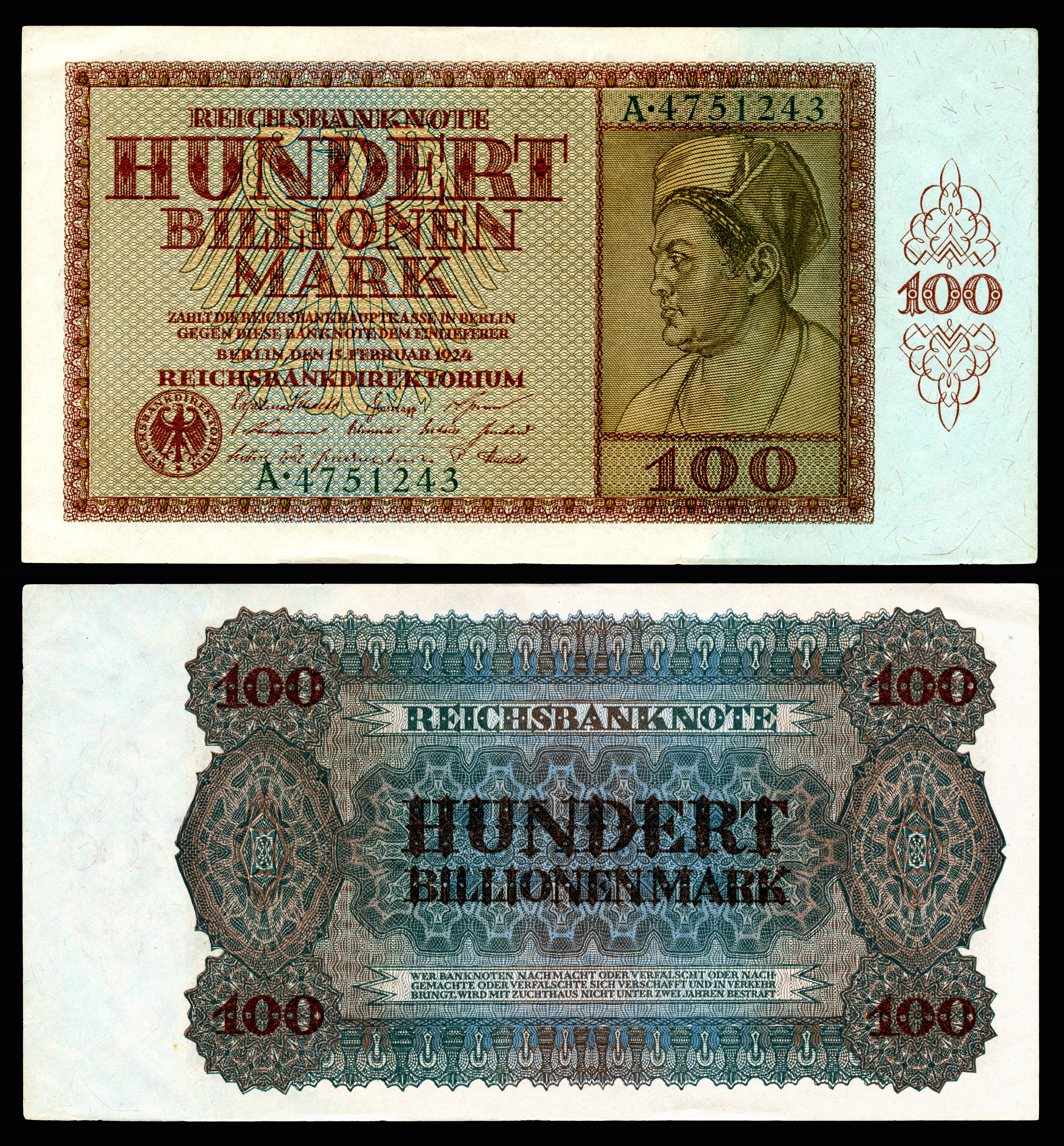
- 100 trillion-ℳ︁ note, 1924 (short scale (US) or 100 billion-ℳ︁ long scale (UK pre-1974, Germany, much of Europe)

Units of account
- Base unit: mark (Note: "Mark" has no plural form.)
- Symbol: ℳ︁
- Subunit
- 1/100: pfennig (Note: "Pfennig" has no plural form.)
- Symbol
- pfennig (Note: "Pfennig" has no plural form.): ₰

Denominations
- Banknotes: 1ℳ︁, 2ℳ︁, 5ℳ︁, 10ℳ︁, 20ℳ︁, 50ℳ︁, 100ℳ︁, 500ℳ︁ 1,000ℳ︁, 5,000ℳ︁, 10,000ℳ︁, 20,000ℳ︁, 50,000ℳ︁, 100,000ℳ︁, 200,000ℳ︁, 500,000ℳ︁ 1-million-ℳ︁, 2-million-ℳ︁, 5-million-ℳ︁, 10-million-ℳ︁, 20-million-ℳ︁, 50-million-ℳ︁, 100-million-ℳ︁, 500-million-ℳ︁ 1-billion-ℳ︁, 5-billion-ℳ︁, 10-billion-ℳ︁, 20-billion-ℳ︁, 50-billion-ℳ︁, 100-billion-ℳ︁, 200-billion-ℳ︁, 500-billion-ℳ︁ 1-trillion-ℳ︁, 2-trillion-ℳ︁, 5-trillion-ℳ︁, 10-trillion-ℳ︁, 20-trillion-ℳ︁, 50-trillion-ℳ︁, 100-trillion-ℳ︁
- Coins: 1₰, 2₰, 5₰, 10₰, 50₰ (1/2ℳ︁); 1ℳ︁, 3ℳ︁, 200ℳ︁, 500ℳ︁

Demographics
- Replaced: German mark (1871)
- Replaced by: Rentenmark
- User(s): German Empire (Germany) Weimar Republic; Free City of Danzig; Klaipėda Region

Issuance
- Central bank: Reichsbank

Valuation
- Pegged with: United States dollar = 4.2-trillion-ℳ︁ = RM4.20 (1 trillion short scale (US) or 1 billion long scale (UK pre-1974, Germany, much of Europe) = 1,000,000,000,000)
- This infobox shows the latest status before this currency was rendered obsolete.

Papiermark (German: [paˈpiːɐ̯ˌmaʁk]; lit. 'paper mark') was a derisive term for the Mark (sign: ℳ︁) after it went off the gold standard, and most specifically with the era of hyperinflation in Germany of 1922 and 1923. Formally, the same German mark was used from 1871 to 1923. Like many countries, Germany departed the gold standard due to the outbreak of World War I, and stopped issuing gold coins backed in marks in August 1914. Precious metals rapidly disappeared from circulation, and inflation occurred as paper money was used to cover war debts in 1914 to 1918. Still, the papiermark is more associated with the early Weimar Republic era, when inflation grew out of control. By the time the mark was retired from circulation and redenominated in December 1923, banknotes had amounts in the billions and trillions of marks by face value.

== History ==
From 1914, the value of the mark fell. The rate of inflation rose following the end of World War I and reached its highest point in October 1923. The currency stabilized in November 1923 after the announcement of the creation of the Rentenmark, although the Rentenmark did not come into circulation until 1924. When it did, it replaced the Papiermark at the rate of 1-trillion (10^{12})-ℳ︁ to RM1. On 30 August 1924 the Rentenmark was replaced by the Reichsmark.

In addition to the issues of the government, emergency issues of both tokens and paper money, known as Kriegsgeld (war money) and Notgeld (emergency money), were produced by local authorities.

The Papiermark was also used in the Free City of Danzig until it was replaced by the Danzig Gulden in late 1923. Several coins and emergency issues in Papiermark were issued by the free city.

== Coins ==
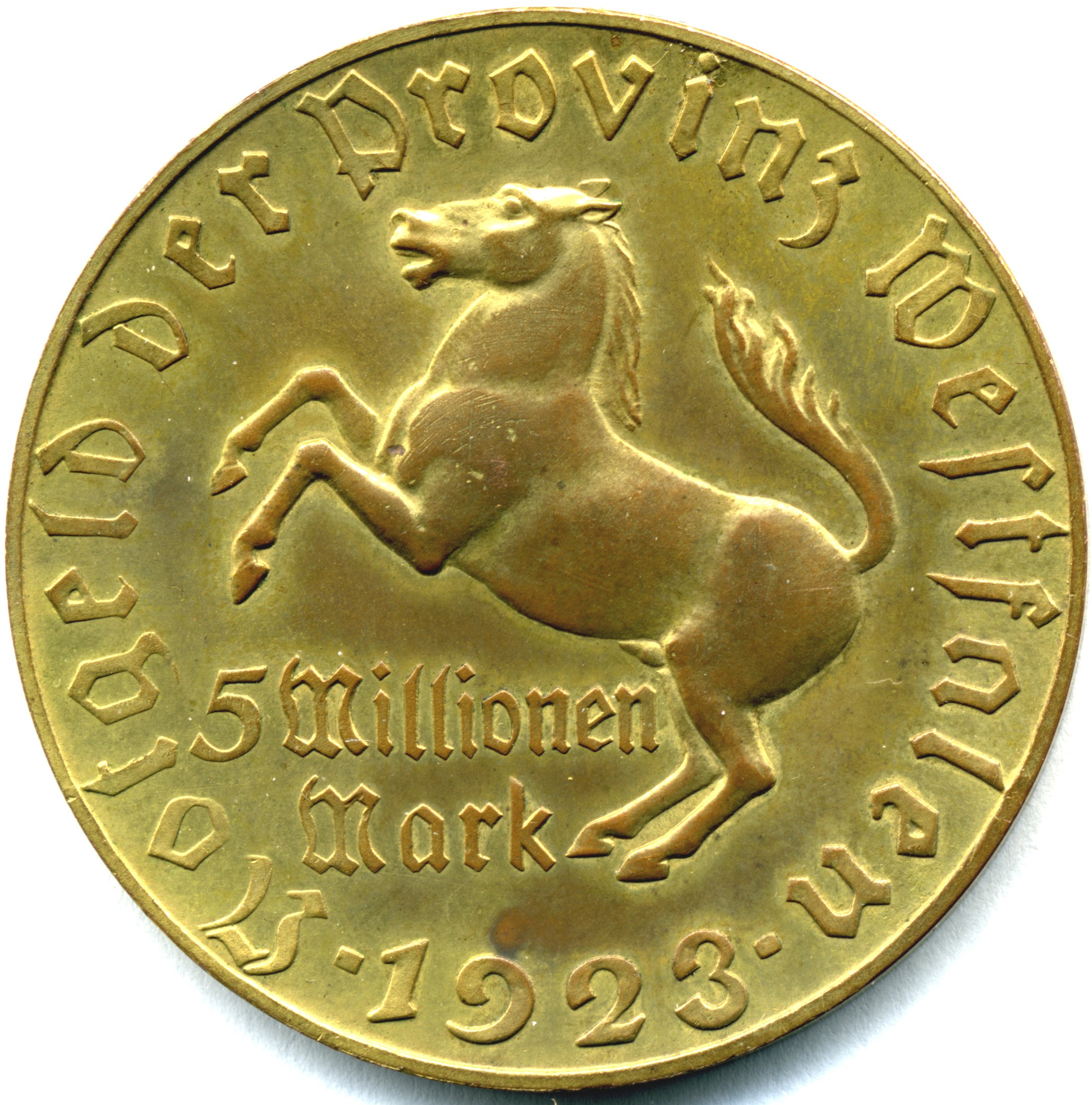
A 5-million-ℳ︁ coin would have been worth US$714.29 in January 1923, but only about 1 thousandth of one cent by October 1923.

During the war, cheaper metals were introduced for coins, including aluminium, zinc and iron, although silver 1/2ℳ︁ pieces continued in production until 1919. Aluminium 1₰ were produced until 1918 and the 2₰ until 1916. Whilst iron 5₰, both iron and zinc 10₰, and aluminium 50₰ coins were issued until 1922. Aluminium 3ℳ︁ were issued in 1922 and 1923, and aluminium 200ℳ︁ and 500ℳ︁ were issued in 1923. The quality of many of these coins varied from decent to poor.

During this period, many provinces and cities also had their own corresponding coin and note issues, referred to as Notgeld currency. This came about often due to a shortage of exchangeable tender in one region or another during the war and hyperinflation periods. Some of the most memorable of these to be issued during this period came from Westphalia and featured the highest face value denominations on a coin ever, eventually reaching 1-billion-ℳ︁.

=== First World War issues ===
In 1914, the State Loan Office began issuing paper money known as Darlehnskassenschein (loan fund notes). These circulated alongside the issues of the Reichsbank. Most were 1ℳ︁ and 2ℳ︁ notes but there were also 5ℳ︁, 20ℳ︁, 50ℳ︁ and 100ℳ︁ notes.

=== Post-war issues ===
Between 1914 and the end of 1923 the Papiermark's rate of exchange against the U.S. dollar plummeted from 4.2ℳ︁ = US$1 to 4.2-trillionℳ︁ = US$1. The price of one gold mark (358 mg of pure gold) in German paper currency at the end of 1918 was 2ℳ︁, but by the end of 1919 a gold mark cost 10ℳ︁. This inflation worsened between 1920 and 1922, and the cost of a gold mark (or conversely, the depreciation of the paper mark) rose from 15ℳ︁ to 1,282ℳ︁. In 1923 the value of the paper mark had its worst decline. By July, the cost of a gold mark had risen to 101,112ℳ︁, and in September was already at 13-million-ℳ︁. On 30 Nov 1923 it cost 1-trillion-ℳ︁ to buy a single gold mark.

In October 1923, Germany experienced a 29,500% hyperinflation (roughly 21% interest per day). Historically, this one-month inflation rate has only been exceeded three times: Yugoslavia, 313,000,000% (64.6% per day, January 1994); Zimbabwe, 79.6 billion% (98% per day, November 2008); and Hungary, 41.9 quadrillion% (207% per day, July 1946).

On 15 November 1923 the Papiermark was replaced by the Rentenmark at RM4.2 Rentenmark = US$1, or 1 trillion-ℳ︁ = RM1 (exchangeable through July 1925).

During the hyperinflation, ever higher denominations of banknotes were issued by the Reichsbank and other institutions (notably the Reichsbahn railway company). The Papiermark was produced and circulated in enormously large quantities. Before the war, the highest denomination was 1,000ℳ︁, equivalent to approximately £48 18s sterling or US$238.09. In early 1922, 10,000ℳ︁ notes were introduced, followed by 100,000ℳ︁ and 1-million-ℳ︁ notes in February 1923. July 1923 saw notes up to 50-million-ℳ︁, with 10-milliard (10^{10})-ℳ︁ notes introduced in September. The hyperinflation peaked in October 1923 and banknote denominations rose to 100-trillion (10^{14})-ℳ︁. At the end of the hyperinflation, these notes were worth approximately £5 4s sterling or US$23.81.

== Weimar Republic (1920–24) ==
Republic Treasury Notes, Weimar Republic Reichsbanknote
Year	Issue	Value (Note: All values are in Reichsbank Mark.)	Date (Note: Series date printed on the banknote.)	Image	Comments
1920	First	10ℳ︁	6 Feb 1920		126 mm × 84 mm (5.0 in × 3.3 in)
1920	First	50ℳ︁	23 Jul 1920		150 mm × 100 mm (5.9 in × 3.9 in)
1920	First	100ℳ︁	1 Nov 1920		Portraits based on the Bamberg riders at Bamberg Cathedral; 162 mm × 108 mm (6.4 in × 4.3 in)
1922	First	10,000ℳ︁	19 Jan 1922		Portrait of a young Man by Albrecht Dürer; 210 mm × 124 mm (8.3 in × 4.9 in)
1922	Second	500ℳ︁	27 Mar 1922		Jakob Meyer of the Meyer zum Pfeil family 175 mm × 112 mm (6.9 in × 4.4 in)
1922	Second	500ℳ︁	7 Jul 1922		173 mm × 90 mm (6.8 in × 3.5 in)
1922	Third	100ℳ︁	4 Aug 1922		162 mm × 90 mm (6.4 in × 3.5 in)
1922	Third	1,000ℳ︁	15 Sep 1922		160 mm × 85 mm (6.3 in × 3.3 in)
1922	Third	5,000ℳ︁	16 Sep 1922		Section of Portrait of a Man with a Coin by Hans Memling; 130 mm × 90 mm (5.1 in × 3.5 in)
1922	Third	5,000ℳ︁	19 Nov 1922		Portrait of Hans Urmiller based on Portrait of Hans Urmiller and his Son by Barthel Beham; 198 mm × 107 mm (7.8 in × 4.2 in)
1922	Third	50,000ℳ︁	19 Nov 1922		Bürgermeister Arnold von Brauweiler based on Burgomaster Arnold von Brauweiler by Barthel Bruyn the Elder; 190 mm × 110 mm (7.5 in × 4.3 in)
1922	Fourth	5,000ℳ︁	2 Dec 1922		Merchant Imhof based on Portrait of a Man by Albrecht Dürer; 130 mm × 90 mm (5.1 in × 3.5 in)
1922	Fifth	1,000ℳ︁	15 Dec 1922		Portrait of Jörg Herz based on Jörg Herz Nürnberger Münzmeister by Georg Pencz; 140 mm × 90 mm (5.5 in × 3.5 in)
1923	First	100,000ℳ︁	1 Feb 1923		Merchant Georg Giese based on Portrait of Georg Giese by Hans Holbein the Younger; 190 mm × 115 mm (7.5 in × 4.5 in)
1923	Second	10,000ℳ︁	3 Feb 1923		Not issued
1923	Second	20,000ℳ︁	20 Feb 1923		160 mm × 95 mm (6.3 in × 3.7 in)
1923	Second	1,000,000ℳ︁	20 Feb 1923		160 mm × 110 mm (6.3 in × 4.3 in)
1923	Third	5,000ℳ︁	15 Mar 1923		Portrait of Hans Urmiller based on Portrait of Hans Urmiller and his Son by Barthel Beham; 148 mm × 90 mm (5.8 in × 3.5 in)
1923	Third	500,000ℳ︁	1 May 1923		170 mm × 95 mm (6.7 in × 3.7 in)
1923	Third	2,000,000ℳ︁	23 Jul 1923		Merchant Georg Giese based on Portrait of Georg Giese by Hans Holbein the Younger; 162 mm × 87 mm (6.4 in × 3.4 in)
1923	Third	5,000,000ℳ︁	1 Jun 1923		170 mm × 95 mm (6.7 in × 3.7 in)
1923	Fourth	100,000ℳ︁	25 Jul 1923		110 mm × 80 mm (4.3 in × 3.1 in)
1923	Fourth	500,000ℳ︁	25 Jul 1923		175 mm × 80 mm (6.9 in × 3.1 in)
1923	Fourth	1,000,000ℳ︁	25 Jul 1923		160 mm × 95 mm (6.3 in × 3.7 in)
1923	Fourth	1,000,000ℳ︁	25 Jul 1923		185 mm × 80 mm (7.3 in × 3.1 in)
1923	Fourth	5,000,000ℳ︁	25 Jul 1923		190 mm × 80 mm (7.5 in × 3.1 in)
1923	Fourth	10,000,000ℳ︁	25 Jul 1923		195 mm × 80 mm (7.7 in × 3.1 in)
1923	Fourth	20,000,000ℳ︁	25 Jul 1923		195 mm × 83 mm (7.7 in × 3.3 in)
1923	Fourth	50,000,000ℳ︁	25 Jul 1923		195 mm × 86 mm (7.7 in × 3.4 in)
1923	Fifth	50,000ℳ︁	9 Aug 1923		105 mm × 70 mm (4.1 in × 2.8 in)
1923	Fifth	200,000ℳ︁	9 Aug 1923		115 mm × 70 mm (4.5 in × 2.8 in)
1923	Fifth	1,000,000ℳ︁	9 Aug 1923		120 mm × 80 mm (4.7 in × 3.1 in)
1923	Fifth	2,000,000ℳ︁	9 Aug 1923		125 mm × 80 mm (4.9 in × 3.1 in)
1923	Fifth	5,000,000ℳ︁	20 Aug 1923		128 mm × 80 mm (5.0 in × 3.1 in)
1923	Fifth	10,000,000ℳ︁	22 Aug 1923		125 mm × 80 mm (4.9 in × 3.1 in)
1923	Fifth	100,000,000ℳ︁	22 Aug 1923		150 mm × 85 mm (5.9 in × 3.3 in)
1923	Sixth	20,000,000ℳ︁	1 Sep 1923		125 mm × 82 mm (4.9 in × 3.2 in)
1923	Sixth	50,000,000ℳ︁	1 Sep 1923		124 mm × 84 mm (4.9 in × 3.3 in)
1923	Sixth	500,000,000ℳ︁	1 Sep 1923		155 mm × 85 mm (6.1 in × 3.3 in)
1923	Sixth	500,000,000,000ℳ︁	1 Sep 1923		Specimen only
1923	Sixth	1,000,000,000,000ℳ︁	1 Sep 1923		Specimen only
1923	Seventh	1,000,000,000ℳ︁	5 Sep 1923		Overprinted on 15 Dec 1922 note 140 mm × 90 mm (5.5 in × 3.5 in)
1923	Seventh	1,000,000,000ℳ︁	5 Sep 1923		160 mm × 86 mm (6.3 in × 3.4 in)
1923	Seventh	5,000,000,000ℳ︁	10 Sep 1923		165 mm × 85 mm (6.5 in × 3.3 in)
1923	Seventh	10,000,000,000ℳ︁	15 Sep 1923		
1923	Seventh	10,000,000,000ℳ︁	1 Oct 1923		160 mm × 105 mm (6.3 in × 4.1 in)
1923	Seventh	20,000,000,000ℳ︁	1 Oct 1923		140 mm × 90 mm (5.5 in × 3.5 in)
1923	Seventh	50,000,000,000ℳ︁	10 Oct 1923		176 mm × 86 mm (6.9 in × 3.4 in)
1923	Seventh	200,000,000,000ℳ︁	15 Oct 1923		140 mm × 80 mm (5.5 in × 3.1 in)
1923	Eighth	1,000,000,000ℳ︁	20 Oct 1923		127 mm × 61 mm (5.0 in × 2.4 in)
1923	Eighth	5,000,000,000ℳ︁	20 Oct 1923		130 mm × 64 mm (5.1 in × 2.5 in)
1923	Eighth	500,000,000,000ℳ︁	20 Oct 1923		Overprinted on 15 Mar 1923 note Portrait of Hans Urmiller based on Portrait of Hans Urmiller and his Son by Barthel Beham; 145 mm × 90 mm (5.7 in × 3.5 in)
1923	Ninth	50,000,000,000ℳ︁	26 Oct 1923		135 mm × 65 mm (5.3 in × 2.6 in)
1923	Ninth	100,000,000,000ℳ︁	26 Oct 1923		135 mm × 65 mm (5.3 in × 2.6 in)
1923	Ninth	500,000,000,000ℳ︁	26 Oct 1923		137 mm × 65 mm (5.4 in × 2.6 in)
1923	Ninth	100,000,000,000ℳ︁	26 Oct 1923		174 mm × 86 mm (6.9 in × 3.4 in)
1923	Tenth	1,000,000,000,000ℳ︁	1 Nov 1923		137 mm × 65 mm (5.4 in × 2.6 in)
1923	Tenth	5,000,000,000,000ℳ︁	1 Nov 1923		168 mm × 86 mm (6.6 in × 3.4 in)
1923	Tenth	10,000,000,000,000ℳ︁	1 Nov 1923		171 mm × 86 mm (6.7 in × 3.4 in)
1923	Tenth	10,000,000,000,000ℳ︁	1 Nov 1923		120 mm × 82 mm (4.7 in × 3.2 in)
1923	Eleventh	100,000,000,000ℳ︁	5 Nov 1923		135 mm × 65 mm (5.3 in × 2.6 in)
1923	Eleventh	1,000,000,000,000ℳ︁	5 Nov 1923		143 mm × 86 mm (5.6 in × 3.4 in)
1923	Eleventh	2,000,000,000,000ℳ︁	5 Nov 1923		120 mm × 71 mm (4.7 in × 2.8 in)
1923	Eleventh	5,000,000,000,000ℳ︁	7 Nov 1923		165 mm × 86 mm (6.5 in × 3.4 in)
1924	First	10,000,000,000,000ℳ︁	1 Feb 1924		140 mm × 72 mm (5.5 in × 2.8 in)
1924	First	20,000,000,000,000ℳ︁	5 Feb 1924		Portrait of a woman based on Portrait of a young Venetian woman by Albrecht Dürer; 160 mm × 95 mm (6.3 in × 3.7 in)
1924	First	50,000,000,000,000ℳ︁	10 Feb 1924		Jakob Muffel based on Portrait of Jakob Muffel by Albrecht Dürer; 175 mm × 95 mm (6.9 in × 3.7 in)
1924	First	100,000,000,000,000ℳ︁	15 Feb 1924		Portrait of Willibald Pirckheimer based on a painting by Albrecht Dürer; 180 mm × 95 mm (7.1 in × 3.7 in)
1924	Second	5,000,000,000,000ℳ︁	15 Mar 1924		120 mm × 72 mm (4.7 in × 2.8 in)

== Danzig ==
The Danziger Privat Actien-Bank (opened 1856) was the first bank established in Danzig. They issued two series of notes denominated in thalers (1857 and 1862–73) prior to issuing the mark (1875, 1882, 1887). These mark issues are extremely rare. The Ostbank fur Handel and Gewerbe opened 16 March 1857, and by 1911 two additional banks (the Imperial Bank of Germany and the Norddeutsche Credit-Anstalt) were in operation.

=== Issuance of the Danzig Papiermark ===
The Papiermark was issued by Danzig from 1914 to 1923. Five series were issued during World War I by the City Council (1914, 1916, 1918 first and second issue, and 1919). Denominations ranged from 10₰ to 20ℳ︁. The Free City of Danzig municipal senate issued an additional four post-World War I series of notes (1922, 1923 First issue, 1923 Provisional issue, and 1923 Inflation issue). The 1922 issue (31 October 1922) was denominated in 100ℳ︁, 500ℳ︁, and 1,000ℳ︁ notes. The denominations for the 1923 issue were 1,000ℳ︁ (15 March 1923), and 10,000ℳ︁ and 50,000ℳ︁ notes (20 March 1923). The 1923 provisional issue reused earlier notes with a large red stamp indicating the new (and higher) denominations of 1 million-ℳ︁ (8 August 1923) and 5 million-ℳ︁ (15 October 1923) mark. The last series of Danzig mark was the 1923 inflation issue of 1 million-ℳ︁ (8 August 1923), 10 million-ℳ︁ (31 August 1923), 100 million-ℳ︁ (22 September 1923), 500 million-ℳ︁ (26 September 1923), 5 billion-ℳ︁ and 10 billion-ℳ︁ notes (11 October 1923). The Danzig mark was replaced by the Danzig gulden, first issued by the Danzig Central Finance Department on 22 October 1923.

Papiermark of Danzig
Issue	Value	Image
1914 Emergency	50₰	
1914 Emergency	1ℳ︁	
1914 Emergency	2ℳ︁	
1914 Emergency	3ℳ︁	
1916	10₰	
1916	50₰	
1918 First	5ℳ︁	
1918 First	20ℳ︁	
1918 Second	50₰	
1918 Second	20ℳ︁	
1919	50₰	
1922	100ℳ︁	
1922	500ℳ︁	
1922	1,000ℳ︁	
1923 First	1,000ℳ︁	
1923 First	10,000ℳ︁	
1923 First	10,000ℳ︁	
1923 First	50,000ℳ︁	
1923 Provisional	1,000,000ℳ︁	
1923 Provisional	5,000,000ℳ︁	
1923 Inflation	1,000,000ℳ︁	
1923 Inflation	10,000,000ℳ︁	
1923 Inflation	100,000,000ℳ︁	
1923 Inflation	500,000,000ℳ︁	
1923 Inflation	5,000,000,000ℳ︁	
1923 Inflation	10,000,000,000ℳ︁	

== Note on numeration ==
In German, Milliarde is 1,000,000,000, or one thousand million, while Billion is 1,000,000,000,000, or one million million.

== See also ==
- 1922 in Germany
- 1923 in Germany
- Hyperinflation
- Hyperinflation in Zimbabwe
- Inflation hedge

== Notes ==
Preceded by: Goldmark; Reason: suspension of gold standard	Currency of Germany; 1914 – 1923	Succeeded by: Rentenmark; Reason: inflation Ratio: 1 Rentenmark = 1,000,000,000,000 Papiermark, and 4.2 Rentenmark = US$1
