= Tiedemann Giese =

Polish bishop and writer

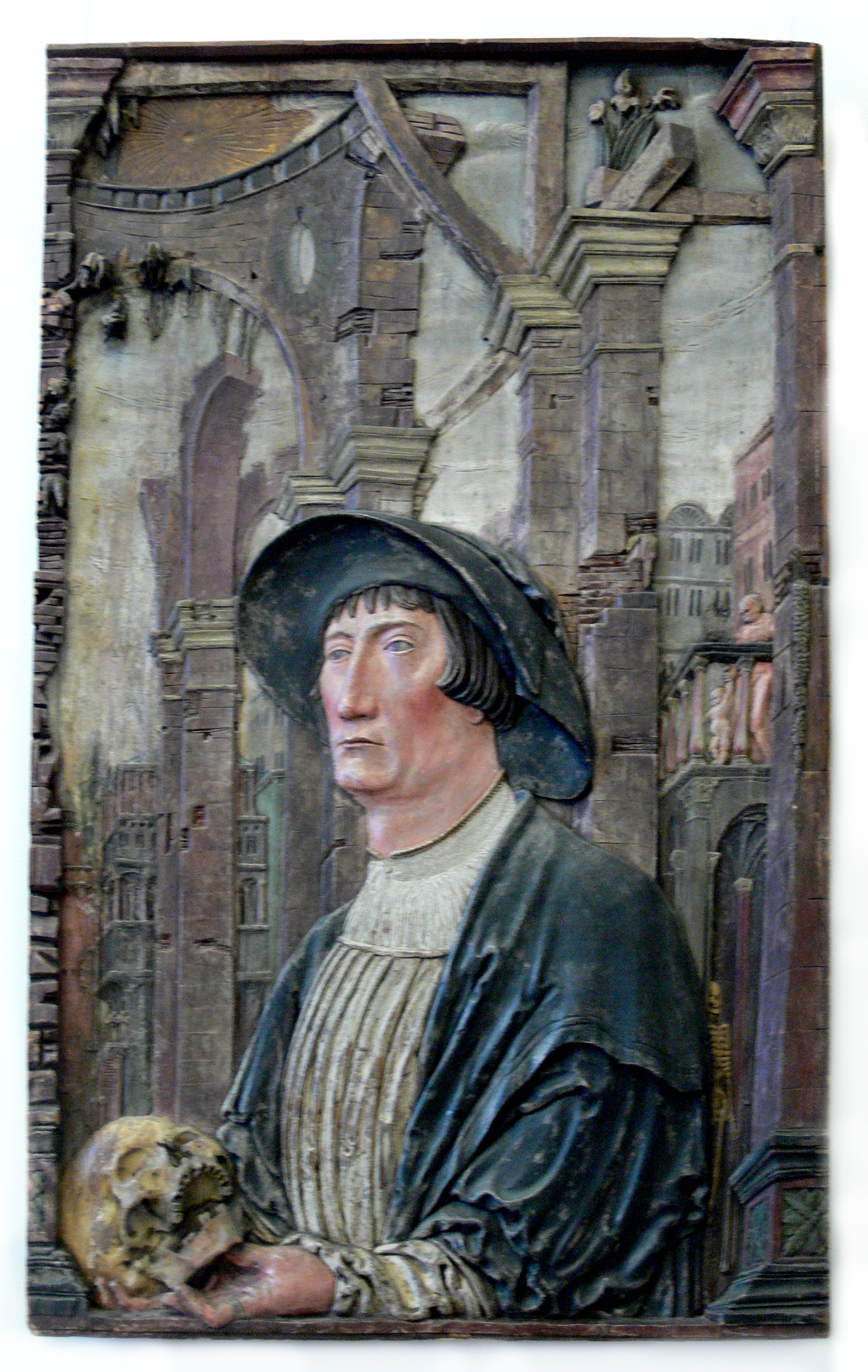
- Tiedemann Giese, around 1525–1530, painting by Hans Schenck
- Born: 1 June 1480; Danzig (Gdańsk), Kingdom of Poland
- Died: 23 October 1550 (aged 70); Lidzbark (Heilsberg)
- Occupation(s): Theologian author, Bishop of Chełmno, Prince-Bishop of Warmia (Ermland)
- Notable work: Antilogikon flosculorum Lutheranorum, 1523; Anacrisis nominis Jesus, 1542; De Regno Christi

Tiedemann Giese (1 June 1480 – 23 October 1550), was Bishop of Kulm (Chełmno) first canon, later Prince-Bishop of Warmia (Ermland) whose interest in mathematics, astronomy, and theology led him to mentor a number of important young scholars, including Copernicus. He was a prolific writer and correspondent, publishing a number of works on the reformation of the church. Tiedemann was a member of the patrician Giese family of Danzig (Gdańsk). The Giese family ancestors originated from Unna in Westphalia, near Dortmund. His father was Albrecht Giese and his younger brother, the Hanseatic League merchant Georg Giese.

== Life and career ==
Giese was the fifth child of Albrecht Giese and his wife, Elisabeth Langenbeck, both members of wealthy merchant families. His paternal family had emigrated from Cologne to Danzig in the 1430s. His father was the Mayor of Danzig, and his mother's uncle, Johann Ferber, had been Mayor of Danzig.

At the age of 12 years, Tiedemann, along with his cousin, Johann Ferber, entered the University of Leipzig, and subsequently studied at Basel and in Italy. He earned a Master of Theology degree. Giese was one of the best educated scholars in Prussia, well versed in both theology and the sciences. At age 24, he and Mauritius Ferber (possibly a cousin) became priests at the Catholic Church of St. Peter and St. Paul.

He was secretary to the King of Poland, and later appointed canon of Frauenburg (Frombork), where he remained for 30 years. His residence was the Episcopal Castle at Frauenburg. The King appointed him Bishop of Kulm on 22 September 1537 (ratified by the Pope on 11 January 1538). Toward the end of his life, he became Bishop of Ermland.

Giese was supported by Chancellor Lucas David. He was a humanist and a liberal in the Erasmian mould. Although a Catholic, he demonstrated relative tolerance towards Lutherans. He made himself the spokesperson for a group of liberal and tolerant men who wanted to mediate between the "old-believers" and "the new-believers". In his writings, he expressed the aim of reconciling the Catholic and Protestant branches of the church, but ultimately alienated both of them.

Bishop Giese was a lifelong friend and frequent companion of the astronomer and proponent of heliocentrism Nicolaus Copernicus and shared his interest in astronomy. As a very wealthy man, Giese had the best instruments which, from time to time, he loaned to Copernicus. Giese, seven years younger than Copernicus, was sufficiently well educated to be able to follow Copernicus' studies. Giese bought his friend an ingenious sundial, and gave him an instrument with which he could observe the equinoxes. The mathematician, Rheticus, published a list of Giese's astronomical instruments, which he considered to have been made by men who really understood their mathematics.

Giese actively encouraged his friend, Copernicus, to publish his findings in relation to the movement of the planets in the Solar System. In turn, Copernicus regularly acknowledged his indebtedness to the many friends, especially Giese and Rheticus, who had supported him and encouraged him to publish.

In 1516, Giese was the co-author, with Copernicus, of a letter to the Polish King Sigismund I the Old asking for the King's protection of Prussia against the Teutonic Knights, and generally supported the interests of the Polish Crown against that of the Teutonic Order. Danzig had been part of the State of the Teutonic Order since the Teutonic invasion of Gdańsk Pomerania in 1308. Its population became ethnically German as a result. In 1466 Danzig reverted to the Kingdom of Poland, within which it retained considerable independence (e.g. had its own judiciary and minted its own coinage). The region's ethnic German inhabitants resisted full incorporation into Poland, but turned to the Polish King for support against the Teutonic aggressors.

He also worked on updating the Kulm law while a canon in Ermland. On 1 July 1536 he was designated by King of Poland, Sigismund I, who considered him a very valuable diplomat, as Bishop of Kulm, which was later confirmed by the Pope. After Mauritius Ferber's death, Giese became prince-bishop.

Giese was described by his contemporaries as a very pious man, an extremely learned man, a loyal friend, generous and a man who supported those in need. Nicolaus Copernicus explained that his "devoted friend, Tiedeman Giese, [was] a man filled with the greatest zeal for the divine and the liberal arts."

Giese was a prolific writer and correspondent. He regularly corresponded with young, ambitious scholars, encouraging them and following their careers with interest. In the preface of his book, De revolutionibus, Copernicus credits Giese with encouraging publication and urging him not to conceal the principles on which he deduced his theory of planetary motions. He carried out active correspondence with the humanist Erasmus of Rotterdam, the Lutheran reformer Philip Melanchthon, and the humanist philosopher Damião de Gois.

Among his known publications is Centum et decem assertiones, quas auctor earum Flosculos appellavit de homine interiore et exteriore and Antilogikon, a polemical refutation of Lutheran reformer Johann Briesmann. He also wrote De Regno Christi in which he envisions a reformed, reunited and reinvigorated church, but which now only survives in fragments. He also wrote a treatise defending Copernicus's theory of planetary motions. Most of his other works have been lost, including a treatise on Aristotle.

His friend, Copernicus (who died in 1543) willed his writings to Giese and left his library to the church administration of the Prince-Bishopric of Ermland (Warmia). Bishop Giese died in Heilsberg (Lidzbark) and was laid to rest next to Copernicus at the Frauenburg (Frombork) cathedral.

== Works ==
- Antilogikon flosculorum Lutheranorum (1523)
- Anacrisis nominis Jesus (1542)

== Sources ==
- Teresa Borawska, Tiedemann Giese (1480–1550) w życiu wewnętrznym Warmii i Prus Królewskich [Tiedemann Giese (1480–1550) in the Internal Life of Warmia and Royal Prussia, Olsztyn, 1984.
- Franz Hipler (1879). "Giese, Tiedemann". Allgemeine Deutsche Biographie (in German). Vol. 9. Leipzig: Duncker & Humblot. pp. 151–156.
- Anneliese Triller (1964). "Giese, Tiedemann". Neue Deutsche Biographie (in German). Vol. 6. Berlin: Duncker & Humblot. p. 379.

Catholic Church titles
Regnal titles
Preceded by Johannes Dantiscus	Bishop of Warmia (Ermland); 1549–1550	Succeeded by Stanislaus Hosius
