= Albrecht Giese =

Danzig politician (1524–1580)

- Born: 10 February 1524; Danzig, Kingdom of Poland
- Died: 1 August 1580 (aged 56); Danzig, Polish–Lithuanian Commonwealth
- Occupations: Merchant, councilman, Mayor of Danzig

Albrecht Giese (10 February 1524 – 1 August 1580) was a councilman and diplomat of the city of Danzig (Gdańsk). He was a member of the Hanseatic League and part of an important merchant family that had offices in London and Danzig.

== Early life and education ==
Giese was born in Danzig, in the Kingdom of Poland, to the influential and wealthy merchant Patrician family Giese (or Gisze) on 10 February 1524 (20 February Old Style). The Giese family had emigrated from Unna, near Giesen, Cologne in 1430. They were part of the Hanseatic League, that had come to dominate European trade in the 14th and 15th-centuries. The Giese family maintained offices in London, at the Steelyard, where Hanseatic and foreign merchants congregated and his sons appear to have managed the London branch.

Albrecht studied at the Universities of Greifswald, Wittenberg and Heidelberg.

== Career ==
As was the custom of the time for Hanseatic merchants, he toured Europe for several years to learn different languages after his formal studies, as was necessary for a long-distance trader. In 1564, on his return to Danzig, he married Elisabeth Langenbeck, whose uncle, Johann Ferber, had been the Mayor of Danzig. The following year, Giese became a councilman. Over the next six years, he was Danzig's delegate at several Hanse meetings in Lübeck.

Giese served as a member of a delegation from Danzig to the diet of Lublin in December 1569, along with Mayors Georg Kleefeld, Constantin I Ferber, and Johann Proite. The delegation was imprisoned for four months as part of an ongoing conflict between Polish King Sigismund August and the Danzig city authorities over the creation and activities of the Polish Sea Commission (Komisja Morska) in supporting privateer raids that negatively affected trade in Danzig. The city representatives (including Giese) were ultimately released and returned to Danzig on 17 December 1570.

Giese ultimately became Mayor of Danzig. In 1579, Giese was named royal burgrave of Danzig by the Polish king, a position that entailed the supervision of the judiciary system of the city.

== Personal life and death ==
Albrect and Elisabeth Giese had at least seven children. Two of his sons enjoyed prominent careers. One of his older sons, Tiedemann Giese, became the Bishop of Chełm (Culm) and later, Prince-Bishop of Warmia (Ermland), while one of the younger sons, Georg Giese became a merchant and who is noted for having his portrait painted by Hans Holbein the younger.

Albrecht Giese died on 1 August 1580 (11 August Old Style) in Danzig.
