= Georg Giese =

Hanseatic merchant (1497–1562)

- Portrait by Hans Holbein the Younger (1532)
- Born: 2 April 1497; Danzig
- Died: 3 February 1562 (aged 64); Danzig
- Occupation: Merchant

Georg Giese (Note: The merchant's name is spelled in various ways in the Holbein painting: "Georg Gisze", "Jorgen Gisze" and "Georg Gyse.".) (2 April 1497 – 3 February 1562) was a Hanseatic merchant, who managed his family's office at London's Steelyard for at least 12 years and is noted for having had his portrait painted by Hans Holbein the Younger.

== Life and career ==
Giese was one of the younger sons of Albrecht Giese and his wife, Elisabeth Langenbeck. His father's ancestors originated from Unna in Westphalia, near Cologne, and had moved to Danzig in the 1430s. Georg was born in Danzig (Gdańsk) on 2 April 1497, into a patrician family. His father was the mayor of Danzig, and his mother's uncle had been the mayor of Danzig. He had at least six older siblings, whose names are not entirely clear. Tiedemann Giese, who became the Bishop of Culm (Chełmno), was an older brother.

At the time of his birth, Danzig was an important Hanseatic town. His family was part of a new type of merchant class, that was beginning to dominate trade in 14th- and 15th-century Europe. Rather than haul goods from one market town to another, these new merchants dealt in goods on a large scale, importing and exporting across long distances. They operated on a world stage, often maintaining permanent offices in the larger European cities which were operated by agents or family members. These merchants formed a fraternity of traders known as the Hanseatic League to control trade and remove trade restrictions for their members.

Giese's family had an office in London, which, at the time was the centre of European trade. Situated in the Steelyard, the London branch of the Hanse, the Giese family office was part of an enclave where Hanseatic and foreign merchants congregated. Many of the merchants there originated from Danzig. In the 1520s and 1530s, Giese represented his family's interests from the Steelyard office. The painter, Hans Holbein the Younger, produced portraits of wealthy merchants, including Giese and others based at the Steelyard.

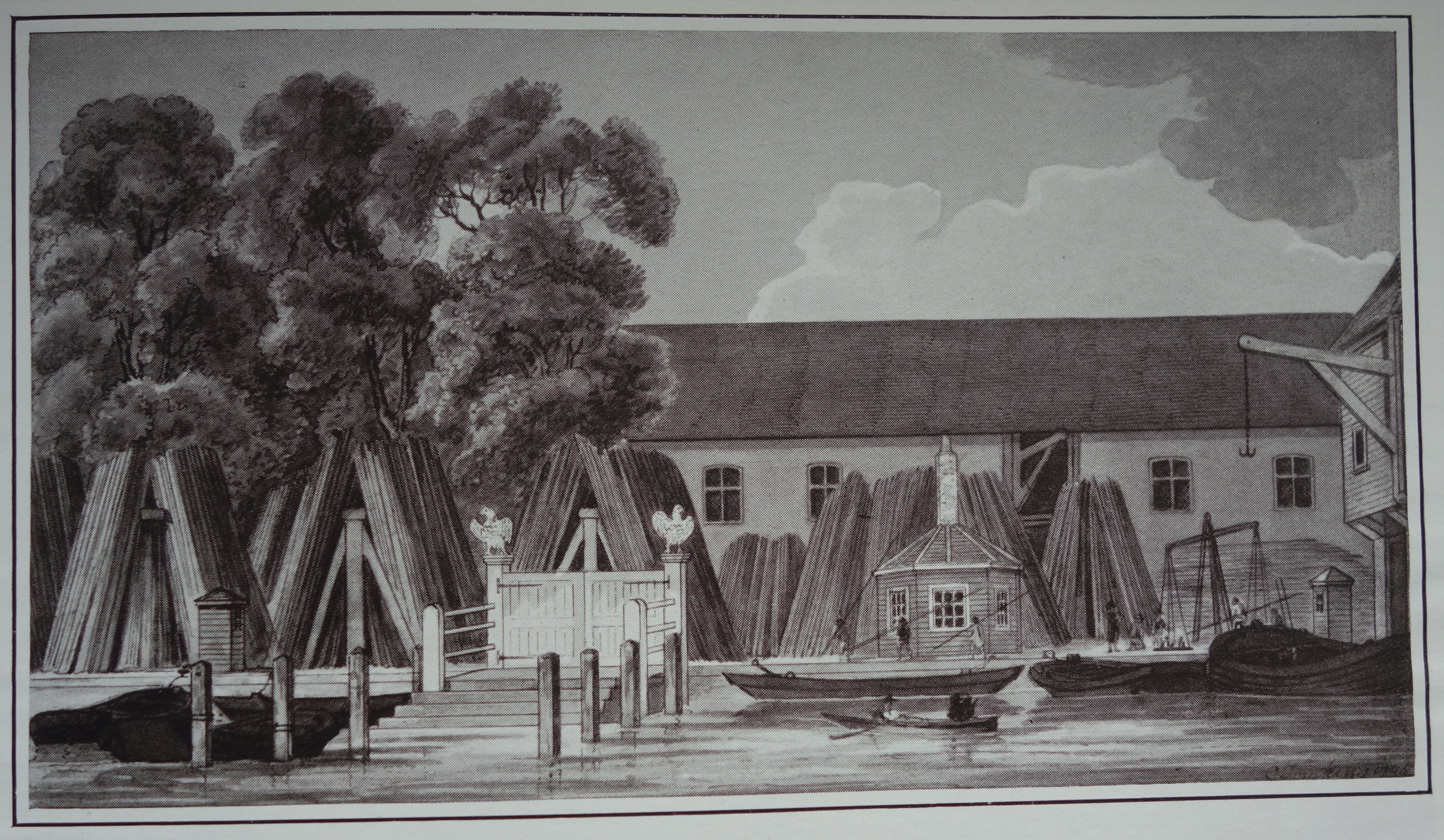
London's Steelyard

Georg Giese's name appears in several documentary sources of the period. An English document from 1522 shows that he was given a protection order to assure safe passage between England and France (dated 26 June 1522; granted by the King of France). Another document shows that he was granted power of attorney to act for Francis Guyse (possibly another older brother) during his absence from the Steelyard while another document states that he was the Alderman's Deputy of the London Steelyard, an important position for a young man (1533). Yet another document from the Danzig Assembly (dated 30 October 1535) identifies the merchant mark of "Jorg Gisse," which scholars believe refers to Georg Giesse, and which is the same symbol as can be seen on the seal depicted on Giese's desk in Holbein's painting.

In 1532, at the age of about 34 years, Giese commissioned a portrait, which scholars believe was intended to be a gift to his betrothed. The portrait is noted for the decor and objects that surround Giese in his London Office, all of which attest to his wealth and status as a member of the rising merchant class.

After returning to his home city of Danzig, in 1535, he married Christine Krüger, daughter of a prominent Danzig merchant, Tiedemann Krüger and grand-daughter of the Mayor of Toruń (Thorn). The couple had ten children.

Giese died on 3 February 1562 in Danzig.

== Portrait by Hans Holbein the Younger ==
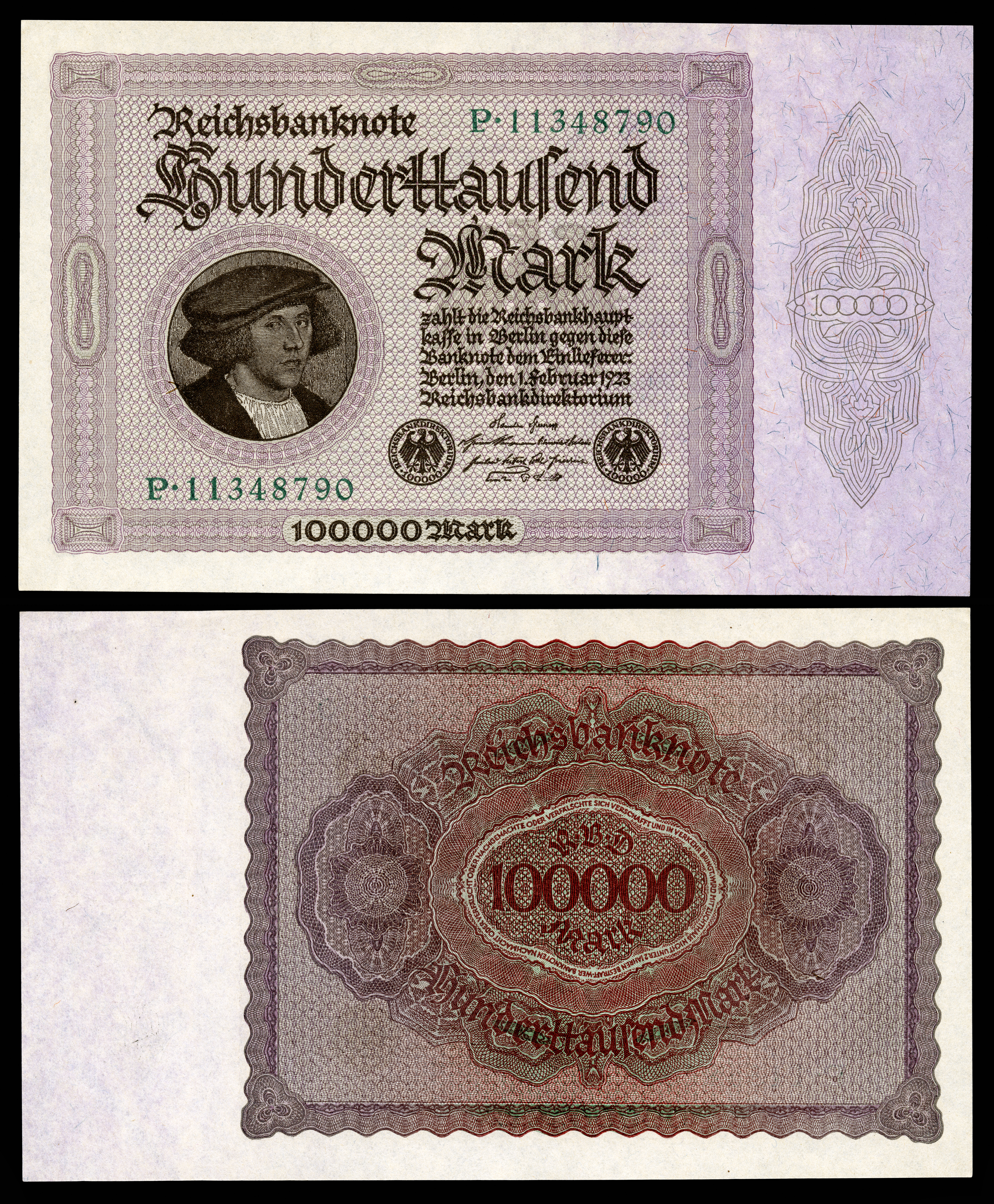
Giese's portrait was depicted on the 100,000 mark banknote of 1923.

While Giese was stationed at the Steelyard during the 1530s, the merchant members located there sat for a series of portraits by Hans Holbein the Younger. These paintings were designed to showcase the merchant's status.

Giese's portrait is unlike the other portraits of merchants in that it locates the subject in an office where many of the accoutrements of a merchant are clearly visible. The Holbein portrait commissioned by Giese, clearly identifies him as a merchant, due to the distinctive clothing and the tools of the trade. The painting is rich with symbols. It depicts him with carnations, at that time symbolizing his engagement.

A plaque over his head identifies him, and states that it shows him in his 34th year, in 1532. He is holding a letter he received from his brother, written in Middle Saxon ("Middle Low German"): "Dem Erszamen/Jorgen gisze to lunden/in engelant mynem/broder to handen" ("To be handed to my brother, the honourable Jorgen gisze at London in England"). In the background and on the desk, letters, stamps and strips of sealing wax indicate his connections to both his family and a network of traders operating in the region. The various pieces of correspondence use different spellings of Giese's name; "Georg Gisze", "Jorgen Gisze" and "Georg Gyse."

== See also ==
- Commerce
- Guild
- List of paintings by Hans Holbein the Younger
- Merchant
